The University of Oxford introduced Titles of Distinction for senior academics in the 1990s. These are not established chairs, which are posts funded by endowment for academics with a distinguished career in British and European universities. However, since there was a limited number of established chairs in these universities and an abundance of distinguished academics it was decided to introduce these Titles of Distinction. 'Reader' and the more senior 'Professor' were conferred annually.

In the 1994–95 academic year, Oxford's congregation decided to confer the titles of Professor and Reader on distinguished academics without changes to their salaries or duties; the title of professor would be conferred on those whose research was "of outstanding quality", leading "to a significant international reputation". Reader would be conferred on those with "a research record of a high order, the quality of which has gained external recognition". This article provides a list of people upon whom the University of Oxford has conferred the title of professor.

In July 1996, the University announced it had appointed 162 new Professors and 99 Readers as part of this move. In January 2001, Congregation's Personnel Committee recommended that the process for awarding titles of distinction should continue biennially, and in October 2001, details of the application process for the 2001–02 academic year were published to that effect, meaning the next awards would be made in October 2002. Awards were then made in 2004, 2006 and 2008. In 2005, a special task force was set up to report back to the University Council about career progression for academics. It made its recommendations in April 2010, when it was decided that the title of Reader should be discontinued and that the title of Professor should continue to be awarded biennially. These measures were given effect by the Vice-Chancellor in May 2010. The next round of awards would be made after Trinity 2011, but were awarded retrospectively (from October 2010); the names of that cohort were announced in January 2012. The next set of awards were made in 2014, and further sets have been made annually since.

2021 
The following were awarded the title of Professor in January 2022:

 Abigail Adams-Prassl, Professor of Economics
 Hazel Assender, Professor of Materials
 Mona Bafadhel, Professor of Respiratory Medicine
 Andrew Baldwin, Professor of NMR Spectroscopy and Biophysical Chemistry
 Christopher Beem, Professor of Mathematics and Theoretical Physics
 Teresa Bejan, Professor of Political Theory
 Sarah Blagden, Professor of Experimental Oncology
 Philip Blunsom, Professor of Computer Science
 Sanja Bogojevic, Professor of Law 
 Pedro Bordalo, Professor of Financial Economics
 Thomas Bowden, Professor of Structural Biology 
 Lucy Bowes, Professor of Developmental Psychopathology 
 Dominic Brookshaw, Professor of Persian Literature and Iranian Culture
 Michael Browning, Professor of Computational Psychiatry 
 Alexander Bullock, Professor of Structural and Chemical Biology 
 Theresa Burt de Perera, Professor of Animal Behaviour 
 Jonathan Burton, Professor of Organic Chemistry 
 Muhammed Cader, Professor of Neuroscience and Neurology 
 Coralia Cartis, Professor of Numerical Optimization 
 Susana Carvalho, Professor of Palaeoanthropology
 Peter Charbel-Issa, Professor of Ophthalmology
 Katrina Charles, Professor of Environmental Health Risks 
 Erica Charters, Professor of the Global History of Medicine 
 Phaik Yeong Cheah, Professor of Global Health
 John Christianson, Professor of Cell Biology
 Katherine Clarke, Professor of Greek and Roman Historiography 
 Stefan Constantinescu, Professor of Cancer Signalling 
 Justin Coon, Professor of Engineering Science
 Bruno Currie, Professor of Greek Literature
 Jan-Emmanuel De Neve, Professor of Economics and Behavioural Science
 Amy Dickman, Professor of Wildlife Conservation
 Cheryl Doss, Professor of International Development 
 Jennifer Dowd, Professor of Demography and Population Health
 Susanna Dunachie, Professor of Infectious Diseases 
 Omer Dushek, Professor of Molecular Immunology 
 Matthew Dyson, Professor of Civil and Criminal Law
 Fumiko Esashi, Professor of Molecular Biophysics
 Mina Fazel, Professor of Adolescent Psychiatry
 Dominik Fischer, Professor of Ophthalmology
 Stephen Fisher, Professor of Political Sociology
 Mark Fricker, Professor of Plant Sciences
 Christopher Gerry, Professor of Public Health and Health Economics in Russia and Eastern Europe
 Nazila Ghanea, Professor of International Human Rights Law
 John-Paul Ghobrial, Professor of Modern and Global History
 Peter Ghosh, Professor of the History of Ideas
 Imogen Goold, Professor of Medical Law
 Anne Goriely, Professor of Human Genetics
 Ulrike Grüneberg, Professor of Molecular Cell Biology
 Margaret Hillenbrand, Professor of Modern Chinese Literature and Culture
 Ling-Pei Ho, Professor of Respiratory Immunology
 Sally Hopewell, Professor of Clinical Trials and Evidence Synthesis
 Joshua Hordern, Professor of Christian Ethics
 David Howey, Professor of Engineering Science
 Wei Huang, Professor of Biological Engineering
 Matthew Husband, Professor in Psycholinguistics
 Sarosh Irani, Professor of Autoimmune Neurology
 Ben Jackson, Professor of Modern History
 Susan James Relly, Professor in Vocational Education
 Lars Jansen, Professor of Molecular Genetics
 Saad Jbabdi, Professor of Biomedical Engineering
 Howard Jones, Professor of Finance 
 Akane Kawamura, Professor of Chemical Biology
 Ian Kiaer, Professor of Contemporary Art
 Jiuen Kiaer, Young Bin Min-KF Professor of Korean Linguistics 
 Patricia Kingori, Professor of Global Health Ethics 
 Morten Kringelbach, Professor of Neuroscience
 Teresa Lambe, Professor of Vaccinology and Immunology 
 Charlie Louth, Professor of German and Comparative Literature 
 Glen Loutzenhiser, Professor of Tax Law
 Anneke Lucassen, Professor of Genomic Medicine
 Lambros Malafouris, Professor of Cognitive and Anthropological Archaeology
 Andrew Markham, Professor of Computer Science
 Richard Maude, Professor of Tropical Medicine
 Karolina Milewicz, Professor of International Relations
 Helen Moore, Professor of English Literature
 Robin Murphy, Professor of Experimental Psychology
 Sonali Nag, Professor of Psychology and Education
 Friederike Otto, Professor of Climate Impact Research
 Dimitris Papanikolaou, Professor of Modern Greek and Comparative Cultural Studies
 J P Park, June and Simon Li Professor in the History of Chinese Art 
 Alexander Paseau, Professor of Mathematical Philosophy 
 Elinor Payne, Professor of Phonetics and Phonology
 Stuart Peirson, Professor of Circadian Neuroscience
 Gail Preston, Professor of Plant–Microbe Interactions
 Joel Rasmussen, Professor of Historical and Philosophical Theology
 Sophie Ratcliffe, Professor of Literature and Creative Criticism 
 Martin Ruhs, Professor of Political Economy
 Susanna-Assunta Sansone, Professor of Data Readiness
 Peter Scarborough, Professor of Population Health
 Martin Schmalz, Professor of Finance and Economics 
 Annette Schuh, Professor of Molecular Diagnostics 
 Benjamin Seymour, Professor of Clinical Neuroscience
 Yang Shi, Professor of Epigenetics 
 Sebastian Shimeld, Professor of Evolutionary Developmental Biology
 Victoria Smith, Professor of Tephrochronology 
 Matthew Snape, Professor of Paediatrics and Vaccinology 
 Maria Stamatopoulou, Professor of Classical Archaeology
 Simon Stanworth, Professor of Transfusion Medicine and Haematology
 Nicolaos Stavropoulos, Professor of Law and Philosophy
 Sandy Steel, Professor of Law and Philosophy of Law
 Nikita Sud, Professor of the Politics of Development
 Carolyn Taylor, Professor of Oncology
 George Tofaris, Professor of Neurology and Translational Neuroscience
 Ruth Travis, Professor of Epidemiology
 Lindsay Turnbull, Professor of Plant Ecology
 Paul Turner, Professor of Paediatric Microbiology
 Antonios Tzanakopoulos, Professor of Public International Law
 Laura Van Broekhoven, Professor of Museum Studies, Ethics, and Material Culture
 Kristin Van Zwieten, Professor of Law and Finance
 Vladyslav Vyazovskiy, Professor of Sleep Physiology
 David Wallom, Professor of Informatics
 Peter Watkinson, Professor of Intensive Care Medicine
 Dagan Wells, Professor of Reproductive Genetics

2020 
The following were awarded the title of Professor in November 2020:

 William Allan, Professor of Greek 
 Ruben Andersson, Professor of Social Anthropology
 Sonia Antoranz Contera, Professor of Biological Physics
 Elizabeth Ashley, Professor of Tropical Medicine
 Michael Barnes, Professor of Physics 
 Stephen Baxter, Professor of Medieval History
 Rebecca Beasley, Professor of Modernist Studies
 Geoffrey Bird, Professor of Cognitive Neuroscience
 Stuart Blacksell, Professor of Tropical Microbiology
 Lapo Bogani, Professor of Molecular Nanomaterials
 Francesca Bufa, Professor of Computational Biology and Cancer Genomics
 Erzsebet Bukodi, Professor of Sociology and Social Policy
 Álvaro Cartea, Professor of Mathematical Finance
 Michael Charles, Professor of Environmental Archaeology 
 Yulin Chen, Professor of Physics 
 Morgan Clarke, Professor of Social Anthropology
 Mark Coles, Kennedy Professor of Immunology
 Garret Cotter, Professor of Physics
 Inge Daniels, Professor of Anthropology 
 Armand D'Angour, Professor of Classics 
 John Davis, Professor of Pharmaceutical Discovery
 Thomas Douglas, Professor of Applied Philosophy
 David Doyle, Professor of Comparative Politics
 David Dupret, Professor of Neuroscience 
 Carolin Duttlinger, Professor of German Literature and Culture
 David Dwan, Professor of English Literature and Intellectual History
 Rebecca Eynon, Professor of Education, the Internet and Society
 Dominic Furniss, Professor of Plastic and Reconstructive Surgery
 Jason Gaiger, Professor of Aesthetics and Art Theory
 Anthony Gardner, Professor of Contemporary Art History
 Jane Gingrich, Professor of Comparative Political Economy
 Andrew Gosler, Professor of Ethno-ornithology
 David Grifths, Professor of Archaeology 
 Nina Hallowell, Professor of Social and Ethical Aspects of Genomics 
 Todd Hancock Hall, Professor of International Relations
 Edward Harcourt, Professor of Philosophy 
 Heather Harrington, Professor of Mathematics
 Catherine Holmes, Professor of Medieval History
 Jemma Hopewell, Professor of Precision Medicine and Epidemiology 
 Laura Hoyano, Professor of Law 
 Antoine Jerusalem, Professor of Mechanical Engineering
 Helen Johnson, Professor of Ocean and Climate Science
 Polly Jones, Professor of Russian 
 Lindsay Judson, Professor of Ancient Philosophy
 Renaud Lambiotte, Professor of Networks and Nonlinear Systems
 Liora Lazarus, Professor in Human Rights Law
 Vili Lehdonvirta, Professor of Economic Sociology and Digital Social Research 
 Jason Lerch, Professor of Neuroscience 
 Jamie Lorimer, Professor of Environmental Geography
 James McCullagh, Professor of Biological Chemistry
 Anna-Maria Misra, Professor of Global History 
 Joe Moshenska, Professor of English Literature 
 Andreas Münch, Professor of Applied Mathematics 
 Gina Neff, Professor of Technology and Society 
 Andrea Nemeth, Professor of Neurogenetics 
 Jaideep Pandit, Professor of Anaesthesia 
 Aris Theodosis Papageorghiou, Professor of Fetal Medicine
 Sarah Pendlebury, Professor of Medicine and Old Age Neuroscience
 Justine Pila, Professor of Law
 John Powell, Professor of Digital Health Care
 Kazem Rahimi, Professor of Cardiovascular Medicine and Population Health 
 Jan Rehwinkel, Professor of Innate Immunology
 Armin Reichold, Professor of Physics 
 Laura Rival, Professor of Anthropology of Development
 Tatjana Sauka-Spengler, Professor of Developmental Genomics and Gene Regulation
 Elena Seiradake, Professor of Molecular Biology
 Joel Shapiro, Professor of Financial Economics
 Hannah Smithson, Professor of Experimental Psychology
 Susannah Speller, Professor of Materials Science
 Andrei Starinets, Professor of Physics 
 Samuel Staton, Professor of Computer Science
 Zofa Stemplowska, Professor of Political Theory
 Peter Stewart, Professor of Ancient Art 
 Mark Stokes, Professor of Cognitive Neuroscience
 William Swadling, Professor of Law 
 Pawel Swietach, Professor of Physiology 
 Helen Swift, Professor of Medieval French Studies
 Marion Turner, Professor of English Literature
 Ellie Tzima, Professor of Cardiovascular Biology
 Carlos Vargas-Silva, Professor in Migration Studies
 Manu Vatish, Professor of Obstetrics 
 Andrea Vedaldi, Professor of Computer Vision and Machine Learning
 John Vella, Professor of Law
 Richard Williams, Professor of Immunology 
 Tim Woollings, Professor of Physical Climate Science

2019 
The following were awarded the title of Professor in October 2019:

 Alessandro Abate, Professor of Verification and Control
 Naomi Allen, Professor of Epidemiology 
 Walter Armbrust, Professor of Modern Middle Eastern Studies
 Richard Bailey, Professor of Environmental Systems
 Justin Benesch, Professor of Biophysical Chemistry 
 Dora Biro, Professor of Animal Behaviour 
 Rafal Bogacz, Professor of Computational Neuroscience
 Neil Bowles, Professor of Planetary Science 
 Holly Bridge, Professor of Neuroscience 
 Andrea Cipriani, Professor of Psychiatry
 David Clifton, Professor of Engineering Science
 Rachel Condry, Professor of Criminology
 Ben Cooper, Professor of Epidemiology
 Cathryn Costello, Professor of Refugee and Migration Law
 Xenia de la Ossa, Professor of Mathematical Physics
 Julie Dickson, Professor of Legal Philosophy
 Susan Downes, Professor of Ophthalmology 
 Hal Drakesmith, Professor of Iron Biology
 Andrew Eggers, Professor of Politics
 Richard Ekins, Professor of Law
 Jonathan Emberson, Professor of Medical Statistics and Epidemiology
 Andrew Farmery, Professor of Anaesthetics 
 Ian Forrest, Professor of Social and Religious History
 Eamonn Gaffney, Professor of Applied Mathematics 
 Dev Gangjee, Professor of Intellectual Property Law
 Constanze Güthenke, Professor of Greek Literature
 Claire Gwenlan, Professor of Physics 
 Richard Haynes, Professor of Renal Medicine and Clinical Trials 
 Therese Hopfenbeck, Professor of Educational Assessment
 Michele Hu, Professor of Clinical Neuroscience 
 Jim Hughes, Professor of Gene Regulation 
 Stephen Hyde, Professor of Molecular Therapy 
 Guy Kahane, Professor of Moral Philosophy
 Maureen Kelley, Professor of Bioethics 
 Tarunabh Khaitan, Professor of Public Law and Legal Theory
 Kayla King, Professor of Evolutionary Ecology 
 Andrew Klevan, Professor of Film Aesthetics
 Simon Leedham, Professor of Gastroenterology 
 Belinda Lennox, Professor of Psychiatry 
 Marina MacKay, Professor of English Literature
 Michèle Mendelssohn, Professor of English and American Literature
 Sassy Molyneux, Professor of Global Health 
 Natalia Nowakowska, Professor of European History
 Piero Olliaro, Professor of Poverty Related Infectious Diseases
 Michael Osborne, Professor of Machine Learning
 Jacqueline Palace, Professor of Neurology 
 Felix Ignacio Parra Diaz, Professor of Physics 
 Susan Perkin, Professor of Physical Chemistry 
 Jeremias Prassl, Professor of Law
 Josephine Quinn, Professor of Ancient History
 Kristijan Ramadan, Professor of Molecular Medicine 
 Fraydoon Rastinejad, Professor of Biochemistry and Structural Biology 
 Moritz Riede, Professor of Soft Functional Nanomaterials 
 Jacob Rowbottom, Professor of Law
 Andrea Ruggeri, Professor of Political Science and International Relations
 Rick Schulting, Professor of Scientific and Prehistoric Archaeology
 Tim Schwanen, Professor of Transport Studies and Geography
 Karin Sigloch, Professor of Geophysics 
 Claudio Sillero-Zubiri, Professor of Conservation Biology
 Michael Smets, Professor of Management
 Lorna Smith, Professor of Chemistry 
 Angela Taylor, Professor of Experimental Astrophysics 
 Peter Thonemann, Professor of Ancient History
 Kate Tunstall, Professor of French
 Frank von Delft, Professor of Structural Chemical Biology 
 Caroline Warman, Professor of French Literature and Thought
 Michael Whitworth, Professor of Modern Literature and Culture
 Niall Winters, Professor of Education and Technology
 Luet Wong, Professor of Chemistry
 Sarah Wordsworth, Professor of Health Economics and Genomics

2018 
The following were awarded the title of Professor in September 2018:

 David Aanensen, Professor of Genomic Epidemiology 
 Laura Ashe, Professor of English Literature 
 Miguel Angel Ballester, Professor of Economics 
 Masooda Bano, Professor of Development Studies 
William Barford, Professor of Theoretical Chemistry
 Jonathan Barrett, Professor of Quantum Information Science 
Dmitry Belyaev, Professor of Mathematics
 Louise Bowman, Professor of Medicine and Clinical Trials 
Paul Brennan, Professor of Medicinal Chemistry
Christopher Buckley, Professor of Translational Inflammation Research
 Felix Budelmann, Professor of Greek Literature 
 Daron Burrows, Professor of Medieval French 
 Paul Chaisty, Professor of Russian and East European Politics 
 Juan-Carlos Conde, Professor of Medieval Spanish Literature and Philology 
 Simon Dadson, Professor of Hydrology 
 Wolfgang de Melo, Professor of Classical Philology 
 Faisal Devji, Professor of Indian History 
 Cristina Dondi, Professor of Early European Book Heritage 
 Simon Draper, Professor of Vaccinology and Translational Medicine 
 Andrea Ferrero, Professor of Economics 
Stephen Fletcher, Professor of Chemistry
Gary Ford, Professor of Stroke Medicine
Jonathan Grimes, Professor of Structural Virology
Dan Hicks, Professor of Contemporary Archaeology
 Leanne Hodson, Professor of Metabolic Physiology 
Rob Hope, Professor of Water Policy
 Marie-Chantal Killeen, Professor of French Literature 
 Nicholas Lakin, Professor of Molecular and Cellular Biology 
 Sarah Lewington, Professor of Epidemiology and Medical Statistics 
 Anna Lisa Lora-Wainwright, Professor of the Human Geography of China 
 James McDougall, Professor of Modern and Contemporary History
 Peter McHugh, Professor of Molecular Oncology 
Craig MacLean, Professor of Evolution and Microbiology
 Lars-Erik Malmberg, Professor of Quantitative Methods in Education 
 Ivan Martinovic, Professor of Computer Science 
 Adam Mead, Professor of Haematology 
Eric O'Neill, Professor of Cell and Molecular Biology
 Stephen John Payne, Professor of Engineering Science 
 Ludovic Phalippou, Professor of Financial Economics 
 Ingmar Posner, Professor of Engineering Science (Applied Artificial Intelligence) 
 Jonathan Prag, Professor of Ancient History 
 Daniel Prieto-Alhambra, Professor of Pharmaco- and Device Epidemiology 
 Najib Rahman, Professor of Respiratory Medicine 
 Felix Reed-Tsochas, Professor of Complex Systems 
Angela Russell, Professor of Medicinal Chemistry
 Diego Sánchez-Ancochea, Professor of the Political Economy of Development 
 Clive Siviour, Professor of Engineering Science 
 Rebeccah Slater, Professor of Paediatric Neuroscience 
 Ricardo Soares de Oliveira, Professor of the International Politics of Africa 
 Charlotte Stagg, Professor of Human Neurophysiology 
 Jin-Chong Tan, Professor of Engineering Science (Nanoscale Engineering) 
 Christopher Timpson, Professor of Philosophy of Physics 
 Damian Tyler, Professor of Physiological Metabolism 
 Holm Uhlig, Professor of Paediatric Gastroenterology 
 Shimon Whiteson, Professor of Computer Science 
 Richard Willden, Professor of Engineering Science 
 Brian Young, Professor of Intellectual History

2017 
The following were awarded the title of Professor in September 2017:

 Aziz Aboobaker, Professor of Functional and Comparative Genomics
 Charalambos Antoniades, Professor of Cardiovascular Medicine
 Konstantin Ardakov, Professor of Mathematics
 Nicholas Barber, Professor of Constitutional Law and Theory
 Karen Barker, Professor of Physiotherapy
 Roger Benson, Professor of Palaeobiology
 Matthew Bevis, Professor of English Literature
 Dan Ciubotaru, Professor of Mathematics
 Jacob Dahl, Professor of Assyriology
 Jeremy Day, Professor of Infectious Diseases
 Marella de Bruijn, Professor of Developmental Haematopoiesis
 Xon de Ros, Professor of Modern Spanish Studies
 Pavlos Eleftheriadis, Professor of Public Law
 Peter Frankopan, Professor of Global History
 John Frater, Professor of Infectious Diseases
 Peter Gething, Professor of Epidemiology
 Deborah Gill, Professor of Gene Medicine
 Christina Goldschmidt, Professor of Probability
 James Goudkamp, Professor of the Law of Obligations
 Sarah Green, Professor of the Law of Obligations
 Ulrich Haisch, Professor of Physics
 Ester Hammond, Professor of Molecular Cancer Biology
 Sondra Hausner, Professor of Anthropology of Religion
 Christopher Hays, Professor of Physics
 Geraldine Hazbun, Professor of Medieval Spanish Literature
 David Hopkin, Professor of European Social History
 Mark Howarth, Professor of Protein Nanotechnology
 Andrew Judge, Professor of Translational Statistics
 Andras Juhasz, Professor of Mathematics
 Aris Katzourakis, Professor of Evolution and Genomics
 Paulina Kewes, Professor of English Literature
 David Kirk, Professor of Sociology
 Pramila Krishnan, Professor of Development Economics
 Alan Lauder, Professor of Mathematics
 Cecilia Lindgren, Professor of Genomic Endocrinology & Metabolism
 Elena Lombardi, Professor of Italian Literature
 Derek McCormack, Professor of Cultural Geography
 Kevin McGerty, Professor of Mathematics
 David Mole, Professor of Renal Medicine
 Michael Moody, Professor of Materials
 Marc Mulholland, Professor of Modern History
 Rasmus Kleis Nielsen, Professor of Political Communication
 Mohamed Omri, Professor of Arabic and Comparative Literature
 Antonis Papachristodoulou, Professor of Engineering Science
 David Parrott, Professor of Early Modern European History
 Claudia Pazos Alonso, Professor of Portuguese and Gender Studies
 Ian Phillips, Professor of Philosophy
 Timothy Power, Professor of Latin American Politics
 Christoph Reisinger, Professor of Applied Mathematics
 Grant Ritchie, Professor of Chemistry
 Philip Robins, Professor of Middle East Politics
 Eduard Sanders, Professor of Global Health Practice
 Nicolai Sinai, Professor of Islamic Studies
 Martin Smith, Professor of Organic Chemistry
 Gabriel Stylianides, Professor of Mathematics Education
 Laura Tunbridge, Professor of Music
 Renier van der Hoorn, Professor of Plant Science
 Kylie Vincent, Professor of Inorganic Chemistry
 Caleb Webber, Professor of Bioinformatics
 Jan Westerhoff, Professor of Buddhist Philosophy
 Catherine Whistler, Professor of the History of European Art
 Rebecca Williams, Professor of Public Law and Criminal Law
 Jennifer Yee, Professor of Literature in French
 Peijun Zhang, Professor of Structural Biology

2016 
The following were awarded the title of Professor in September 2016:

 Edward Anderson, Professor of Organic Chemistry
 Radu Aricescu, Professor of Molecular Neuroscience
 Ash Asudeh, Professor of Semantics
 Stephen Baker, Professor of Molecular Microbiology
 Giles Barr, Professor of Physics
 Helen Barr, Professor of English Literature
 Alan Beggs, Professor of Economics
 Richard Berry, Professor of Biological Physics
 Harish Bhaskaran, Professor of Applied Nanomaterials
 Philip Biggin, Professor of Computational Biochemistry
 Ben Bollig, Professor of Spanish American Literature
 Persephone Borrow, Professor of Viral Immunology
 Alexandra Braun, Professor of Comparative Private Law
 Mark Buckley, Professor of Behavioural and Cognitive Neuroscience
 Michele Cappellari, Professor of Astrophysics
 Liz Carpenter, Professor of Membrane Protein Structural Biology
 Gary Collins, Professor of Medical Statistics
 Patricia Daley, Professor of the Human Geography of Africa
 Susan Doran, Professor of Early-Modern British History
 Lucy Dorrell, Professor of Immunology
 Roel Dullens, Professor of Chemistry
 Edith Elkind, Professor of Computer Science
 Nick Eyre, Professor of Energy and Climate Policy
 Dmitry Filatov, Professor of Evolutionary Genetics
 Jose Goicoechea, Professor of Chemistry
 Mark Graham, Professor of Internet Geography
 Ashleigh Griffin, Professor of Evolutionary Biology
 Martyn Harry, Professor of Composition
 Thorsten Hesjedal, Professor of Condensed Matter Physics
 Anne Kiltie, Professor of Experimental Clinical Oncology
 Philipp Kukura, Professor of Chemistry
 Carolyne Larrington, Professor of Medieval European Literature
 Petros Ligoxygakis, Professor of Innate Immunology
 Paul Lodge, Professor of Philosophy
 Nikolaj Lubecker, Professor of French and Film Studies
 Clare Mackay, Professor of Imaging Neuroscience
 Kate McLoughlin, Professor of English Literature
 Daria Martin, Professor of Art
 Eric T. Meyer, Professor of Social Informatics
 Christiaan Monden, Professor of Sociology and Demography
 Rachel Murphy, Professor of Chinese Development and Society
 Micah Muscolino, Professor of Modern Chinese History
 Simon Newstead, Professor of Molecular Membrane Biology
 Alis Elena Oancea, Professor of Philosophy of Education and Research Policy
 Dan Olteanu, Professor of Computer Science
 Hemant Pandit, Professor of Orthopaedic Surgery
 Fernanda Pirie, Professor of the Anthropology of Law
 Philomen Probert, Professor of Classical Philology and Linguistics
 Amar Rangan, Professor of Orthopaedic Surgery
 Jeremy Robertson, Professor of Chemistry
 Ulrike Roesler, Professor of Tibetan and Himalayan Studies
 Gervase Rosser, Professor of the History of Art
 Jurgen Schneider, Professor of Medical Imaging
 Robert Scotland, Professor of Systematic Botany
 Christian Siebold, Professor of Structural Biology
 Peter Simmonds, Professor of Virology
 Jason Smith, Professor of Photonic Materials and Devices
 Adam Smyth, Professor of English Literature and the History of the Book
 Shankar Srinivas, Professor of Developmental Biology
 Jonny Steinberg, Professor of African Studies
 Joel Tarning, Professor of Clinical Pharmacology
 Dmitrios Tsomocos, Professor of Financial Economics
 Benoit Van den Eynde, Professor of Tumour Immunology
 Dominic Vella, Professor of Applied Mathematics
 Lisa White, Professor of Modelling and Epidemiology
 Dominic Wilkinson, Professor of Medical Ethics
 Mark Woolrich, Professor of Computational Neuroscience
 James Wright, Professor of Orthopaedics
 Alison L. Young, Professor of Public Law

2015 
The following were awarded the title of Professor in November 2015:

 Lesley Abrams, Professor of Early Medieval History
 Colin Akerman, Professor of Neuroscience
 Daniel Anthony, Professor of Experimental Neuropathology
 Arzhang Ardavan, Professor of Physics
 Rhiannon Ash, Professor of Roman Historiography
 James Berkley, Professor of Paediatric Infectious Diseases
 Alexander Betts, Professor of Forced Migration and International Affairs
 Colin Burrow, Professor of English and Comparative Literature
 Mark Chapman, Professor of the History of Modern Theology
 Mindy Chen-Wishart, Professor of the Law of Contract
 Lucie Cluver, Professor of Child and Family Social Work
 Roi Cohen Kadosh, Professor of Cognitive Neuroscience
 Joseph Conlon, Professor of Theoretical Physics
 Cas Cremers, Professor of Information Security
 Bernardo Cuenca Grau, Professor of Computer Science
 Matt Friedman, Professor of Palaeobiology
 Robert Gilbert, Professor of Biophysics
 Kathryn Gleadle, Professor of Gender and Women’s History
 Stephen Goodwin, Professor of Neurogenetics
 Vicente Grau, Professor of Biomedical Image Analysis
 Abigail Green, Professor of Modern European History
 Steven Gunn, Professor of Early Modern History
 Michael Hayward, Professor of Inorganic Chemistry
 Stephen Heyworth, Professor of Latin
 Jane Hiddleston, Professor of Literatures in French
 Matthew Higgins, Professor of Molecular Parasitology
 Peter Horby, Professor of Emerging Infectious Diseases and Global Health
 Susan Jones, Professor of English Literature
 Richard Katz, Professor of Geodynamics
 Greger Larson, Professor of Evolutionary Genomics
 Sergio Lozano-Perez, Professor of Materials Science
 David Lucas, Professor of Physics 
 Ian Maclachlan, Professor of French Literature
 Sophie Marnett, Professor of Medieval French Studies
 Ankhi Mukherjee, Professor of English and World Literatures
 Simon Myers, Professor of Mathematical Genomics
 Donal Nolan, Professor of Private Law
 Jan Obloj, Professor of Mathematics
 Brian Parkinson, Professor of Social Psychology
 Senia Paseta, Professor of Modern History
 Eugene Rogan, Professor of Modern Middle Eastern History
 Alison Salvesen, Professor of Early Judaism and Christianity
 Richard Scholar, Professor of French and Comparative Literature
 Nathalie Seddon, Professor of Biodiversity
 Kirsten Shepherd-Barr, Professor of English and Theatre Studies
 Anna Katharina Simon, Professor of Immunology
 Emma Smith, Professor of Shakespeare Studies
 Christopher Summerfield, Professor of Cognitive Neuroscience
 Denis Talbot, Professor of Cancer Medicine
 Madalena Tarsounas, Professor of Molecular and Cell Biology
 Caroline Terquem, Professor of Physics
 James Tilley, Professor of Politics
 Selina Todd, Professor of Modern History
 Simon Travis, Professor of Clinical Gastroenterology
 Niki Trigoni, Professor of Computer Science
 Stephen Tucker, Professor of Biophysics
 Martin Turner, Professor of Clinical Neurology & Neuroscience
 Christopher Tyerman, Professor of History of the Crusades
 Bart van Es, Professor of English Literature
 Richard Wade-Martins, Professor of Molecular Neuroscience
 Richard Walker, Professor of Earth Sciences
 John Wheater, Professor of Physics
 Clive Wilson, Professor of Cell and Developmental Genetics
 Biao Xiang, Professor of Social Anthropology
 Krina Zondervan, Professor of Reproductive & Genomic Epidemiology

2014 
The following were awarded the title of Professor by the University in November 2014:

 Suzanne Aigrain, Professor of Astrophysics
 Dapo Akande, Professor of Public International Law
 Roy Allison, Professor of Russian and Eurasian International Relations
 Pamela Anderson, Professor of Modern European Philosophy of Religion
 John Kevin Baird, Professor of Malariology
 Eleanor Barnes, Professor of Hepatology and Experimental Medicine
 Alan Barr, Professor of Particle Physics
 Philip Bejon, Professor of Tropical Medicine
 Simon Benjamin, Professor of Quantum Technologies
 David Bennett, Professor of Neurology and Neurobiology
 Amy Bogaard, Professor of Neolithic and Bronze Age Archaeology
 Michael Bonsall, Professor of Mathematical Biology
 Martin Booth, Professor of Engineering Science
 Mary Bosworth, Professor of Criminology
 Ian Brown, Professor of Information Security and Privacy
 Thomas Buchanan, Professor of Modern British and European History
 Malcolm Bull, Professor of Art and the History of Ideas, 
 Philip Bullock, Professor of Russian Literature and Music
 Andrew Bunker, Professor of Astrophysics
 Martin Bureau, Professor of Astrophysics
 Martin Burton, Professor of Otolaryngology
 Byron Byrne, Professor of Engineering Science
 Marco Capogna, Professor of Cellular Neuropharmacology
 William Child, Professor of Philosophy
 Tim Claridge, Professor of Magnetic Resonance
 Robert Clarke, Professor of Epidemiology and Public Health Medicine
 Simon Clarke, Professor of Chemistry
 Radu Coldea, Professor of Physics
 Christopher Conlon, Professor of Infectious Diseases
 Martin Conway, Professor of Contemporary European History
 Stephanie Cragg, Professor of Neuroscience
 Julie Curtis, Professor of Russian Literature
 John Darwin, Professor of Global and Imperial History
 Grigory Dianov, Professor of Molecular Biochemistry
 Kim Dora, Professor of Microvascular Pharmacology
 Robert Douglas-Fairhurst, Professor of English Literature
 Jonathan Doye, Professor of Theoretical Chemistry
 Joanna Dunkley, Professor of Astrophysics
 Mark Edwards, Professor of Early Christian Studies
 Christian Eggeling, Professor of Molecular Immunology
 John Elsner, Professor of Late Antique Art
 Radek Erban, Professor of Mathematics
 Colin Espie, Professor of Sleep Medicines
 Louise Fawcett, Professor of International Relations
 Seena Fazel, Professor of Forensic Psychiatry
 Liz Fisher, Professor of Environmental Law
 Andrew Fowler, Professor of Applied Mathematics
 Susan Fuggle, Professor of Transplant Immunology
 Nicola Gardini, Professor of Italian and Comparative Literature
 George Garnett, Professor of Medieval History
 Christine Gerrard, Professor of English Literature
 Matthew Gibney, Professor of Politics and Forced Migration
 Susan Gillingham, Professor of the Hebrew Bible
 Feliciano Giustino, Professor of Materials
 Anna Gloyn, Professor of Molecular Genetics and Metabolism
 Sion Glyn-Jones, Professor of Orthopaedic Surgery
 Andrew Goodwin, Professor of Materials Chemistry
 Manuele Gragnolati, Professor of Italian Literature
 Jane Green, Professor of Epidemiology
 Daniel Grimley, Professor of Music
 Hanneke Grootenboer, Professor of the History of Art
 Philippe Guerin, Professor of Epidemiology and Global Health 
 Nicholas Halmi, Professor of English and Comparative Literature
 Anthony Harnden, Professor of Primary Care 
 Bob Harris, Professor of British History
 Ralf Hinze, Professor of Software Engineering
 Christopher Hodges, Professor of Justice Systems
 Peter Howell, Professor of Applied Mathematics
 Joanna Innes, Professor of Modern History
 Cigdem Issever, Professor of Particle Physics
 Matthew Jarvis, Professor of Astrophysics
 Mark Jenkinson, Professor of Neuroimaging
 Hugh Jenkyns, Professor of Stratigraphy
 Marina Jirotka, Professor of Human Centred Computing
 Thomas Johansen, Professor of Ancient Philosophy
 Angus Johnston, Professor of Law
 Michael Johnston, Professor of Physics
 Jane Kaye, Professor of Health, Law and Policy 
 Stephen Kearsey, Professor of Cell Biology
 Neil Kenny, Professor of French
 Benedikt Kessler, Professor of Biochemistry and Life Sciences Mass Spectrometry
 Robert Klose, Professor of Cell and Molecular Biology 
 Marian Knight, Professor of Maternal and Child Population Health 
 Julian Knight, Professor of Geonomic Medicine
 Tim Lancaster, Professor of Primary Health Care
 Martin Landray, Professor of Medicine and Epidemiology
 Trudie Lang, Professor of Global Health Research
 Chris Lavy, Professor of Tropical Orthopaedic Surgery
 Rhodri Lewis, Professor of English Literature
 Owen Lewis, Professor of Ecology
 Jane Lucy Lightfoot, Professor of Greek Literature
 Christopher Lintott, Professor of Astrophysics
 Adriaan Louis, Professor of Theoretical Physics
 Conall Mac Niocaill, Professor of Earth Sciences
 Peter McCulloch, Professor of Surgical Science and Practice 
 Peter McDonald, Professor of British and Irish Poetry
 Rose McGready, Professor of Tropical Maternal and Child Health
 Fiona Macintosh, Professor of Classical Reception
 Stuart Mackenzie, Professor of Chemistry
 Peter Magill, Professor of Neurobiology
 William Mander, Professor of History of Modern Philosophy
 Jonathan Marchini, Professor of Statistics
 Andrew Martin, Professor of Systems Security
 Tamsin Mather, Professor of Earth Sciences
 Christopher Melchert, Professor of Arabic and Islamic Studies
 Kim Midwood, Professor of Matrix Biology
 Karla Miller, Professor of Biomedical Engineering
 Peter Mirfield, Professor of the Law of Evidence
 Llewelyn Morgan, Professor of Classical Languages and Literature.
 Teresa Morgan, Professor of Graeco-Roman History
 Boris Motik, Professor of Computer Science
 Shona Murphy, Professor of Molecular Genetics 
 Victoria Murphy, Professor of Applied Linguistics
 Paul Newton, Professor of Tropical Medicine 
 Bent Nielsen, Professor of Econometrics
 Heather O'Donoghue, Professor of Old Norse
 Colin O'Halloran, Professor of Computer Science
 Michael O'Hanlon, Professor of Museum Anthropology
 Ray Owens, Professor of Molecular Biology 
 Deborah Oxley, Professor of Social Science History
 Sarah Parish, Professor of Medical Statistics and Epidemiology
 Laura Peers, Professor of Museum Anthropology
 Rafael Perera-Salazar, Professor of Medical Statistics
 Seamus Perry, Professor of English Literature
 John Pitcher, Professor of English Literature
 Tommaso Pizzari, Professor of Evolutionary Biology
 Mason Porter, Professor of Nonlinear and Complex Systems
 Eduardo Posada-Carbó, Professor of the History and Politics of Latin America
 Thomas Povey, Professor of Engineering Science
 David Priestland, Professor of Modern History
 Diane Purkiss, Professor of English Literature
 Zhongmin Qian, Professor of Mathematics
 Maria Quigley, Professor of Statistical Epidemiology 
 Mike Rayner, Professor of Population Health
 David Rechter, Professor of Modern Jewish History
 Jonathan Rees, Professor of Orthopaedic Surgery and Musculoskeletal Science
 Owen Rees, Professor of Music
 Gillian Reeves, Professor of Statistical Epidemiology 
 Matthew Reynolds, Professor of English and Comparative Criticism
 Dimitra Rigopoulou, Professor of Astrophysics
 Jens Rittscher, Professor of Engineering Science
 Blanca Rodriguez, Professor of Computational Medicine
 Timothy Rood, Professor of Greek Literature
 Richard Rutherford, Professor of Greek and Latin Literature
 Gwendolyn Sasse, Professor of Comparative Politics
 Gaia Scerif, Professor of Developmental Cognitive Neuroscience
 Alexander Schekochihin, Professor of Theoretical Physics
 Julia Schnabel, Professor of Engineering Science
 Alison Shaw, Professor of Social Anthropology
 Nicola Sibson, Professor of Imaging Neuroscience 
 Alison Simmons, Professor of Gastroenterology 
 Lesley Smith, Professor of Medieval Intellectual History
 Philip Stier, Professor of Atmospheric Physics     
 Eleanor Stride, Professor of Engineering Science
 David Stuckler, Professor of Political Economy and Sociology
 Lee Sweetlove, Professor of Plant Sciences
 Balazs Szendroi, Professor of Pure Mathematics
 Graham Taylor, Professor of Mathematical Biology
 Jonathan Thacker, Professor of Spanish Golden Age Literature
 Guy Thwaites, Professor of Infectious Diseases
 Christiane Timmel, Professor of Chemistry
 Stephen Tuck, Professor of Modern History
 Claire Vallance, Professor of Physical Chemistry
 Ann Sarah Walker, Professor of Medical Statistics and Epidemiology 
 David Wallace, Professor of Philosophy of Physics
 Bryan Ward-Perkins, Professor of Late Antique History
 Jamie Warner, Professor of Materials
 Sarah Waters, Professor of Applied Mathematics
 Andrew Wathen, Professor of Computational Mathematics
 Kate Watkins, Professor of Cognitive Neuroscience
 John Watts, Professor of Later Medieval History
 Tony Weidberg, Professor of Physics
 Joanna Weinberg, Professor of Early Modern Jewish History and Rabbinics
 William Whyte, Professor of Social and Architectural History
 Giles Wiggs, Professor of Aeolian Geomorphology
 Wes Williams, Professor of French Literature
 Abigail Williams, Professor of Eighteenth-Century English Literature
 Bridget Wills, Professor of Tropical Medicine
 Mark Wilson, Professor of Chemistry
 Dariusz Wojcik, Professor of Economic Geography
 Hongseok Yang, Professor of Computer Science
 Nick Yeung, Professor of Cognitive Neuroscience
 Zhong You, Professor of Engineering Science
 Duncan Young, Professor of Intensive Care Medicine
 Johannes Zachhuber, Professor of Historical and Systematic Theology
 Oliver Zimmer, Professor of Modern European History

2012 
The following were awarded the title of Professor by the University in January 2012, back-dated to the 2010–11 academic year:

 Sharon Achinstein, Professor of Renaissance Literature
 Christopher Adam, Professor of Development Economics
 Simon Aldridge, Professor of Main Group Chemistry
 Nigel Arden, Professor of Rheumatic Diseases
 Alison Banham, Professor of Haemato-oncology
 David Bannerman, Professor of Behavioural Neuroscience
 Adrian Banning, Professor of Interventional Cardiology
 Andrew Barry, Professor of Political Geography
 David Beard, Professor of Musculoskeletal Science
 Jim Bennett, Professor of the History of Science
Ben Berks, Professor of Biochemistry
Guido Bonsaver, Professor of Italian Cultural History
Chas Bountra, Professor of Translational Medicine
Paul Bowness, Professor of Experimental Rheumatology
Jo Boyden, Professor of International Development
 David Bradshaw, Professor of English Literature
Paul Brand, Professor of English Legal History
Michael Broers, Professor of Western European History
 Michael Burden, Professor of Opera Studies
Martin Castell, Professor of Materials
Dawn Chatty, Professor of Anthropology and Forced Migration
Robin Choudhury, Professor of Cardiovascular Medicine
Patricia Clavin, Professor of International History
 S P Cobbold, MA Oxf, PhD Camb: Professor of Cellular Immunology
 B Coecke, Licentiaat PhD Brussels, Fellow of Wolfson: Professor of Quantum Foundations, Logics and Structures
 Z Cooper, BA Cape Town, DPhil Oxf: Professor of Clinical Psychology
 G B Dalton, MA DPhil Oxf, Fellow of St Cross: Professor of Astrophysics
 A Dancer, BA DPhil Oxf, Fellow of Jesus: Professor of Mathematics
Anne Davies, Professor of Law and Public Policy
 C M Deane, MA Oxf, PhD Camb, Fellow of Kellogg: Professor of Structural Bioinformatics
 A M Dondorp, PhD Amsterdam: Professor of Tropical Medicine
 N J Emptage, BSc UEA, PhD Camb, Fellow of Lincoln: Professor of Neuropharmacology
 M C English, MB BChir MA MD Camb: Professor of International Child Health
 R W Field, MA MEng PhD Camb, Fellow of Balliol: Professor of Engineering Science
 E Fodor, MSc Bratislava, DPhil Oxf, Fellow of Linacre: Professor of Virology
 S Gardner, BCL MA Oxf, Fellow of Lincoln: Professor of Law
Joshua Getzler, Professor of Law and Legal History
 J Gibbons, BSc Edin, DPhil Oxf, Fellow of Kellogg: Professor of Computing 
 R J Gibbons, BM BCh MA DPhil Oxf, Fellow of Green Templeton: Professor of Clinical Genetics
 S C Gilbert, BSc East Ang, PhD Hull: Professor of Vaccinology
 I A Goldin, BA BSc Cape Town, MSc LSE, DPhil Oxf, AMP INSEAD, Fellow of Balliol: Professor of Globalisation and Development
 D R Greaves, BSc Brist, PhD Lond, Fellow of Hertford: Professor of Inflammation Biology
 N Grobert, DPhil Sus, Fellow of Corpus Christi: Professor of Nanomaterials
 L J Gullifer, BCL MA Oxf, Fellow of Harris Manchester: Professor of Commercial Law
 V Halbach, MA PhD Munich, Habil Konstanz, Fellow of New College: Professor of Philosophy
 T Hanke, BSc MSc McMaster, PhD St And: Professor of Vaccine Immunology
 C J Harmer, BSc DPhil York, Fellow of Corpus Christi: Professor of Cognitive Neuroscience 
 R Harris, BA MA Pennsylvania, MA DPhil Oxf, Fellow of New College: Professor of Modern History
 A B Hassan, BSc Lond, BM BCh DPhil Oxf, FRCP, Fellow of Lincoln: Professor of Medical Oncology
 A B Hawkins, BA R’dg, PhD Lond, Fellow of Kellogg: Professor of History
 A E Henke, DPhil Oxf, Dipl Heidelberg, Fellow of Pembroke: Professor of Mathematics
 J J W Herring, BCL MA Oxf, Fellow of Exeter: Professor of Law
 L M Herz, PhD Camb, Dipl Bonn, Fellow of Brasenose: Professor of Physics
 T T Hien, PhD Open, MD Saigon, FRCP: Professor of Tropical Medicine
 T F G Higham, BA MA Otago, DPhil Waikato, Fellow of Keble: Professor of Archaeological Science
 E A Holmes, BA Oxf, PhD Camb, DClinPsy Lond: Professor of Clinical Psychology
 S C P Horobin, BA PhD Sheff, Fellow of Magdalen: Professor of English Language and Literature
 R G Hoyland, MA DPhil Oxf, Fellow of St Cross: Professor of Islamic History
 C E Hoyle, BA Kent, MSc DPhil Oxf, Fellow of Green Templeton: Professor of Criminology
 E L Hsu, MPhil PhD Camb, PD Habil Heidelberg, Dipl Natwiss ETH Zurich, Fellow of Green Templeton: Professor of Anthropology
 P G J Irwin, MA DPhil Oxf, Fellow of St Anne's: Professor of Planetary Physics
 D H Jaksch, Mag PhD Innsbruck, Fellow of Keble: Professor of Physics
Beata Javorcik, Professor of International Economics
 Heidi Johansen-Berg, Professor of Cognitive Neuroscience
 A S Kahn, BA Amherst, MA Harvard, MA DPhil Oxf, Fellow of St Edmund Hall: Professor of Russian Literature
 J Kristensen, MA PhD TU Denmark, Fellow of Magdalen: Professor of Mathematics
 D Kroening, PhD Saarland, Fellow of Magdalen: Professor of Computer Science
 Jennifer Kurinczuk, BSc MB ChB MD Leic, MSc Lond: Professor of Perinatal Epidemiology
 E E Leach, MMus Lond, MA DPhil Oxf, Fellow of St Hugh's: Professor of Music 
Thomas Lukasiewicz, Professor of Computer Science
 P E McCullough, BA California, PhD Princeton, Fellow of Lincoln: Professor of English
 P D McDonald, BA MA Rhodes, DPhil Oxf, Fellow of St Hugh's: Professor of English and Related Literature
 H I McShane, BSc MB BS PhD Lond: Professor of Vaccinology
 G J Mallinson, MA PhD Camb, Fellow of Trinity: Professor of Early Modern French Literature
 L Miller, BSc Leic, PhD Camb: Professor of Astrophysics
 P J R Millican, BPhil MA Oxf, MSc PhD Leeds, Fellow of Hertford: Professor of Philosophy
 M G Moloney, BSc PhD Sydney, Fellow of St Peter's: Professor of Chemistry
 P Montgomery, BA Keele, MSc DPhil Oxf, Fellow of Green Templeton: Professor of Psycho-social Intervention
 P D Nellist, MA PhD Camb, Fellow of Corpus Christi: Professor of Materials
 M G New, BSc Cape Town, MPhil PhD Camb, Student of Christ Church: Professor of Climate Science
 P M Newman, MEng Oxf, PhD Sydney, Fellow of New College: Professor of Engineering Science
 C J Norbury, MA Oxf, PhD Lond, Fellow of Queen's: Professor of Molecular Pathology
 D C O'Brien, MA PhD Camb, Fellow of Balliol: Professor of Engineering Science
 C A O'Callaghan, BM BCh MA DPhil DM Oxf, FRCP, Fellow of Queen's: Professor of Medicine
 G S Ogg, BM BCh MA DPhil Oxf, Student of Christ Church: Professor of Dermatology
 J Ouaknine, BSc MSc McGill, DPhil Oxf, Fellow of St John's: Professor of Computer Science
 S D Palfrey, BA ANU, DPhil Oxf, Fellow of Brasenose: Professor of English Literature
 J Payne, MA Camb, Fellow of Merton: Professor of Corporate Finance Law
 W E Peel, BCL MA Oxf, Fellow of Keble: Professor of Law
 M D Petraglia, BA New York, MA PhD New Mexico, Fellow of Linacre: Professor of Human Evolution and Prehistory
 A J Price, MB BChir Lond, MA Camb, DPhil Oxf, FRCS(Orth)Eng, Fellow of Worcester: Professor of Orthopaedic Surgery 
 R N Price, MB BChir MA Camb, FRCP, FRCPath, FRACP: Professor of Tropical Medicine
 C Redfield, BA Wellesley, MA PhD Harvard, Fellow of Wolfson: Professor of Molecular Biophysics
 I D Reid, BSc Western Australia, DPhil Oxf, Fellow of Exeter: Professor of Engineering Science
 R E M Rickaby, MA PhD Camb, Fellow of Wolfson: Professor of Biogeochemistry
 I S D Roberts, BSc MB ChB Manc, FRCPath, Student of Christ Church: Professor of Cellular Pathology
 J W H Schnupp, BSc Lond, BA Open, DPhil Oxf, Fellow of St Peter's: Professor of Neuroscience
 R C Schroeder, BA Williams College, MSc PhD Lond: Professor of Social Science of the Internet
 J A G Scott, BA Camb, BM BCh Oxf, MSc DTM&H Lond, FRCP: Professor of Epidemiology
 T Sharp, BSc Birm, PhD Nott, Fellow of University College: Professor of Neuropharmacology
 S Shepperd, BA Vermont, MSc Harvard, DPhil Oxf: Professor of Health Services Research
 C P Simmons, BSc PhD Melbourne: Professor of Infectious Diseases
 H W Small, BA Wellington, PhD Camb, Fellow of Pembroke: Professor of English Literature
 N Stargardt, BA PhD Camb, Fellow of Magdalen: Professor of Modern European History
 M D Stears, BA DPhil Oxf, Fellow of University College: Professor of Political Theory
 S Sturgeon, BA Texas, MA PhD Arizona, Fellow of Wadham: Professor of Philosophy
 R Thomas, MA Oxf, PhD Lond, Fellow of Balliol: Professor of Ancient Greek History
 R I Todd, MA Camb, DPhil Oxf, Fellow of St Catherine's: Professor of Materials
 D J Vaux, BM BCh MA DPhil Oxf, Fellow of Lincoln: Professor of Cell Biology
 J Villar, MSc Guatemala, MPH Harvard, MD Rosario: Professor of Perinatal Medicine 
 P Vyas, BA Camb, BM DPhil Oxf, Fellow of St Anne's: Professor of Haematology
Bernd Wannenwetsch, Professor of Systematic Theology and Ethics
 R Washington, BA Natal, DPhil Oxf, Fellow of Keble: Professor of Climate Science 
 D J Watson, MA Camb, PhD Pennsylvania, Fellow of Green Templeton: Professor of Higher Education
 T J G Whitmarsh, BA MPhil PhD Camb, Fellow of Corpus Christi: Professor of Ancient Literatures
 G R Wilkinson, BSc Lond, DPhil Oxf, Student of Christ Church: Professor of Physics
 T N Williams, MB BS PhD Lond, MRCP: Professor of Tropical Medicine
 P R Wilshaw, MA Camb, DPhil Oxf, Fellow of St Anne's: Professor of Materials 
 T H Wilson, MPhil Lond, MA Oxf, Fellow of Balliol: Professor of the Arts of the Renaissance
 S L F Wollenberg, MA DPhil Oxf, Fellow of Lady Margaret Hall: Professor of Music
 C Wong, SB MIT, MA PhD Berkeley, Fellow of Lady Margaret Hall: Professor of Chinese Public Finance
 M J A Wood, BM BCh Cape Town, MA DPhil Oxf, Fellow of Somerville: Professor of Neuroscience
 J B Worrell, BA MSc DPhil Oxf, Fellow of Green Templeton: Professor of Computer Science
 V Worth-Stylianou, MA DPhil Oxf, Fellow of Trinity: Professor of French
 W C M Yip, BA Berkeley, PhD MIT: Professor of Health Policy and Economics
Giulia Zanderighi, Professor of Physics
Nicole Zitzmann, Professor of Virology

2008 
The following were awarded the title of Professor by the University in 2008:

 J.H. Alexander, BA Princeton, D.Phil. Oxf, Fellow of Linacre College: Professor of Commonwealth Studies
 J.M. Armitage, B.Sc. MB BS Lond, FFPH UK, FRCP Lond: Professor of Clinical Trials and Epidemiology
 R.M. Ballaster, MA D.Phil. Oxf, Fellow of Mansfield College: Professor of Eighteenth Century Studies
 S.D. Biller, BA Michigan, MS Ph.D. California, Fellow of Mansfield College: Professor of Particle Physics
 A. Blakeborough, MA Ph.D. Camb, Fellow of Worcester College: Professor of Engineering Science
 K.M. Blundell, MA Ph.D. Camb, Fellow of St John’s College: Professor of Astrophysics
 N. Bostrom, BA Göteborg, MA Stockholm, Ph.D. Lond, Fellow of St Cross College: Professor of Applied Ethics
 C.D. Brewer, MA D.Phil. Oxf, MA Toronto, Fellow of Hertford College: Professor of English Language and Literature
 N. Brockdorff, B.Sc. Sus, Ph.D. Glas: Professor of Biochemistry
 K.W. Burton, Ph.D. Lond: Professor of Earth Sciences
 J. Cartwright, BCL MA Oxf, Student of Christ Church: Professor of the Law of Contract
 H. Chapel, MA MD Camb, FRCP, F.R.C.Path., Fellow of Somerville College: Professor of Clinical Immunology
 J.S. Coleman, BA D.Phil. York, Fellow of Wolfson College: Professor of Phonetics
 M.J. Collins, MA D.Phil. Oxf, Fellow of University College: Professor of Mathematics
 A.M. Cooper-Sarkar, MA D.Phil. Oxf, Fellow of St Hilda’s College: Professor of Particle Physics
 R.S. Crisp, B.Phil. MA D.Phil. Oxf, Fellow of St Anne’s College: Professor of Moral Philosophy
 D.W. M Crook, MB B.Ch. Witwatersrand: Professor of Microbiology
 R.J.O. Davies, BM DM S’ton, FRCP Lond, Fellow of Hertford College: Professor of Respiratory Medicine
 A.F. Deighton, MA Dip.Ed. Oxf, MA Ph.D. R’dg, Fellow of Wolfson College: Professor of European International Politics
 S.E. Dopson, B.Sc. Ph.D. Leic, M.Sc. Lond, MA Oxf, Fellow of Green Templeton College: Professor of Organisational Behaviour
 S.S. Douglas-Scott, BA LL.M. Lond, Dip.Law City, Fellow of Lady Margaret Hall: Professor of European and Human Rights Law
 S.R. Duncan, MA Camb, M.Sc. Ph.D. Lond, Fellow of St Hugh’s College: Professor of Engineering Science
 J.J. Edelman, B.Comm. Murdoch, B.Ec. LL.B. Western Australia, D.Phil. Oxf, Fellow of Keble College: Professor of the Law of Obligations
 D.F. Feeny, BA Oxf, MBA Harvard, Fellow of Green Templeton College: Professor of Information Management
 P. Ferreira, Lic Lisbon, Ph.D. Imp Lond, Fellow of Oriel College: Professor of Astrophysics
 G.D. Flood, BA MA Ph.D. Lanc, Fellow of Wolfson College: Professor of Hindu Studies and Comparative Religion
 B. Frellesvig, MA Ph.D. Copenhagen, Fellow of Hertford College: Professor of Japanese Linguistics
 E.F. Garman, B.Sc. Durh, D.Phil. Oxf: Professor of Molecular Biophysics
 C.R. Goding, B.Sc. Leeds, Ph.D. CNAA: Professor of Oncology
 V. Gouverneur, BA M.Sc., Ph.D. Louvain, Fellow of Merton College: Professor of Chemistry
 C.A. Greenhalgh, B.Sc. M.Sc. Lond, MA Oxf, Ph.D. Princeton: Fellow of St Peter’s College: Professor of Applied Economics
 E. Higginbottom, MA Ph.D. Camb, Fellow of New College: Professor of Choral Music
 I.M. Hook, MA Ph.D. Camb, Student of Christ Church: Professor of Astrophysics
 S.M. Hooker, MA D.Phil. Oxf, Fellow of Merton College: Professor of Atomic and Laser Physics
 H.B. Hotson, BA MA Toronto, D.Phil. Oxf, Fellow of St Anne’s College: Professor of Early Modern Intellectual History
 J. Hyman, B.Phil. MA D.Phil. Oxf, Fellow of Queen’s College: Professor of Aesthetics
 H. Jones, F.Inst.P, C.Eng., C.Phys.: Professor of Condensed Matter Physics
 S. Knapp, Ph.D. Karolinska Institute: Professor of Structural Biology
 K.M. Kohl, BA MA Ph.D. Lond, MA CNAA, Fellow of Jesus College: Professor of German Literature
 S.M. Lea, MA D.Phil. Oxf, Fellow of Brasenose College: Professor of Chemical Pathology
 K.J. Leeder, BA D.Phil. Oxf, Fellow of New College: Professor of Modern German Literature
 I.S. Lemos, BA Athens, D.Phil. Oxf, Fellow of Merton College: Professor of Classical Archaeology
 J.C. Lennox, MA Ph.D. Camb, MA D.Phil. Oxf, MA Surrey, D.Sc. Wales, Fellow of Green Templeton College: Professor of Mathematics
 S.P. Llewelyn, BA Ph.D. Sheff, M.Sc. Leeds, Fellow of Harris Manchester College: Professor of Clinical Psychology
 G. Lowe, BA M.Sc. D.Phil., Oxf, Fellow of St Catherine’s College: Professor of Computer Science
 A. Lukas, B.Sc. Dipl Wuppertal, Ph.D. Munich, Fellow of Balliol College: Professor of Theoretical Physics
 L.E. Maguire, BA Ph.D. Lond, MA Birm, Shakespeare Institute, Fellow of Magdalen College: Professor of English Literature
 K. Mayhew, M.Sc. Lond, MA Oxf: Professor of Education and Economic Performance
 P.R.A. McGuinness, BA Camb, MA York, D.Phil. Oxf, Fellow of St Anne’s College: Professor of French and Comparative Literature
 L. McNay, BA MA Sus, Ph.D. Camb, Fellow of Somerville College: Professor of the Theory of Politics
 E.J.C. Mellor, B.Sc. Manc, Ph.D. R’dg, Fellow of Queen’s College: Professor of Biochemistry
 R.S.R. Mitter, MA Ph.D. Camb, Fellow of St Cross College: Professor of the History and Politics of Modern China
 S.J. Mulhall, BA D.Phil. Oxf, MA Toronto, Fellow of New College: Professor of Philosophy
 I.J. Neary, BA Sheff, D.Phil. Sus, Fellow of St Antony’s College: Professor of the Politics of Japan
 K. Nicolaïdis, Ph.D. Harvard, Fellow of St Antony’s College: Professor of International Relations
 J.R. Ockendon, BA D.Phil. Oxf: Professor of Mathematics
 U.C.T. Oppermann, B.Sc. M.Sc. Ph.D. Marburg, Associate Professor, Karolinska Institute: Professor of Molecular Biology
 J. Pallot, BA Leeds, Ph.D. Lond, Student of Christ Church: Professor of the Human Geography of Russia
 L.L. Peers, BA Trent, MA Winnipeg/Manitoba, Ph.D.
 F. Pezzella, MD Rome: Professor of Tumour Pathology
 A. Phelan, MA Ph.D. Camb, MA Oxf, Fellow of Keble College: Professor of German Romantic Literature
 F.M. Platt, B.Sc. Lond, Ph.D. Bath, Fellow of Merton College: Professor of Biochemistry and Pharmacology
 A.J. Pollard, B.Sc. MB BS Ph.D. Lond, DIC, MRCP, FRCPCH, Fellow of St Cross College: Professor of Paediatric Infection and Immunity
 D.M. Pyle, MA Ph.D. Camb, Fellow of St Anne’s College: Professor of Earth Sciences
 J. Radcliffe Richards, BA Keele, B.Phil. Oxf, MA Calgary: Professor of Practical Philosophy
 R.D. Rogers, BA M.Sc. Lond, MA Oxf, Ph.D. Camb, Fellow of Jesus College: Professor of Cognitive Neuroscience
 M.F.S. Rushworth, BA D.Phil. Oxf: Professor of Cognitive Neuroscience
 S.W. Saunders, MA Oxf, Ph.D. Lond, Fellow of Linacre College: Professor of Philosophy of Physics
 R.L. Saxton, B.Mus. D.Mus. Oxf, MA Camb, FGSM, Fellow of Worcester College: Professor of Composition
 L.M. Scott, BA MA Ph.D. Texas, MBA SMU, Fellow of Green Templeton College: Professor of Marketing
 M.P. Searle, B.Sc. Wales, Ph.D. Open, Fellow of Worcester College: Professor of Earth Sciences
 D.J. Siveter, B.Sc. Ph.D. Leic, Fellow of St Cross College: Professor of Earth Sciences
 F.J. Stafford, BA Leic, M.Phil. D.Phil. Oxf, Fellow of Somerville College: Professor of English Language and Literature
 T.P. Stern, MA Oxf, Ph.D. Camb, Fellow of University College: Professor of Early Modern Drama
 M.J. Stevens, MA M.Sc. M.Phil. D.Phil. Oxf, Fellow of Lincoln College: Professor of Economics
 J.M. Sykes, BA MA Ph.D. Camb, Fellow of Mansfield College: Professor of Materials
 S.A.G. Talmon, LL.M. Camb, MA D.Phil. Oxf, Habil Tübingen, Fellow of St Anne’s College: Professor of Public International Law
 R.A. Taylor, MA D.Phil. Oxf, Fellow of Queen’s College: Professor of Condensed Matter Physics
 N. Thatte, B.Tech. Bombay, MS Ph.D. Berkeley, Fellow of Keble College: Professor of Astrophysics
 I.P. Thompson, B.Sc. Ph.D. Essex: Professor of Engineering Science
 C. Trifogli, BA Pisa, Ph.D. Milan, Fellow of All Souls College: Professor of Medieval Philosophy
 H.A. Viles, MA Camb, D.Phil. Oxf, Fellow of Worcester College: Professor of Biogeomorphology and Heritage Conservation
 A.M. Volfing, MA D.Phil. Oxf, Fellow of Oriel College: Professor of Medieval German Studies
 A. Watson, BA M.Sc. Open, D.Phil. Oxf, Fellow of Linacre College: Professor of Mathematics Education
 S.M. Watt, B.Sc. New England, Ph.D. Melbourne: Professor of Haematology
 M.S. Williams, B.Sc. Ph.D. Brist, MA Oxf, Fellow of New College: Professor of Engineering Science
 G. Yassin, B.Sc. M.Sc. Hebrew University Jerusalem, Ph.D. Keele, Fellow of Hertford College: Professor of Astrophysics

2006 
The following were awarded the title of Professor by the University in 2006:

 G. Abramson, MA, Fellow of St Cross College: Professor of Hebrew and Jewish Studies
 D.M. Anderson, MA, Fellow of St Cross College: Professor of African Politics
 C. Baigent, BM, B.Ch., MA, Fellow of Green College: Professor of Epidemiology
 A. Battacharya, Senior Research Fellow in Engineering and Continuing Education: Professor of Engineering Science with effect from 1 October 2006
 H. Becher: Professor of Cardiac Ultrasound
 E.K. Bikoff: Professor of Mammalian Genetics
 W.J. Blair, MA, Fellow of Queen's College: Professor of Medieval History and Archaeology
 A.T. Boothroyd, MA, Fellow of Oriel College: Professor of Physics
 S. Bright, BCL, MA, Fellow of New College: Professor of Land Law
 P. Brocklehurst, MA status: Professor of Perinatal Epidemiology
 M. Brouard, MA, Fellow of Jesus College: Professor of Chemistry
 H.R. Brown, MA, Fellow of Wolfson College: Professor of Philosophy of Physics
 A.H. Buchanan, MA, Fellow of St Hilda's College: Professor of Social Work
 C.P. Buckley, MA, D.Phil., Fellow of Balliol College: Professor of Engineering Science
 J.V. Byrne, MA status: Professor of Neuroradiology
 J. Caplan, MA, D.Phil., Fellow of St Antony's College: Professor of Modern European History
 R.D. Caplan, MA, Fellow of Linacre College: Professor of International Relations
 G. Capoccia, MA, Fellow of Corpus Christi College: Professor of Comparative Politics
 B. Casadei, MA status: Professor of Cardiovascular Medicine
 A. Cavalleri, Fellow of Merton College: Professor of Physics
 D.O.M. Charles, B.Phil., MA, D.Phil., Fellow of Oriel College: Professor of Philosophy
 Z. Chen: Professor of Epidemiology
 R.J. Cornall, BM, B.Ch., MA, D.Phil., Fellow of Corpus Christi College: Professor of Immunology
 N. Cronk, MA, D.Phil., Fellow of St Edmund Hall: Professor of French Literature
 J. Cross, MA, Student of Christ Church: Professor of Musicology
 M. Dalrymple, Fellow of Linacre College: Professor of Linguistics
 B.G. Davis, BA, D.Phil., Fellow of Pembroke: Professor of Chemistry with effect from 10 May 2006
 S. Das, MA, Fellow of Exeter College: Professor of Earth Sciences
 J.W.M. Davies, MA, Fellow of Kellogg College: Professor of Software Engineeting
 N.P.J. Day, BM, B.Chi., DMr: Professor of Tropical Medicine
 L. Dreyfus, MA, Fellow of Magdalen College: Professor of Music
 F.P.E. Dunne, MA, Fellow of Hertford College: Professor of Engineering Science
 S.J. Elston, MA status, Fellow of St John's College: Professor of Engineering Science
 T.A.O. Endicott, MA status, M.Phil., D.Phil., Fellow of Balliol College: Professor of Legal Philosophy
 F.H.L. Essler, MA, Fellow of Worcester College: Professor of Physics
 M. Fafchamps, MA, Fellow of Mansfield College: Professor of Development Economics
 J.C.T. Fairbank, MA Status: Professor of Spinal Surgery
 J. Farrar, D.Phil.: Professor of Tropical Medicine
 E.V.K. FitzGerald, MA, Fellow of St Antony's College: Professor of International Development
 E.V. Flynn, MA, Fellow of New College: Professor of Mathematics
 R. G. Foster: Professor of circadian Neuroscience
 J. Fox, Senior Research Fellow in the Department of Engineering Science: Professor of Engineering Science with effect from 1 January 2007
 D. Gaffan, MA: Professor of Behavioural Neuroscience
 D. Gauguier: Professor of Mammalian Genetics
 P.D. Giles, MA, D.Phil., Fellow of Linacre College: Professor of American Literature
 M.H. Goldsmith, MA, D.Phil., Fellow of Worcester College: Visiting Professor of Computing Science
 P.J.R. Goulder: Professor of Immunology
 K. Graddy, MA, Fellow of Exeter College: Professor of Applied Economics
 J.F. Gregg, MA, D.Phil., Fellow of Magdalen College: Professor of Physics
 T.C. Guilford, MA, D.Phil., Fellow of Merton College: Professor of Animal Behaviour
 S. Gupta, MA, Fellow of Linacre College: Professor of Theoretical Epidemiology
 H. Hamerow, MA, D.Phil., Fellow of St Cross College: Professor of Archaeology
 M.W. Hankins: Professor of Visual Neuroscience
 C.K. Harley, MA, Fellow of St Antony's College: Professor of Economic History
 S. Harper, MA, D.Phil., Fellow of Nuffield College: Professor of Gerontology
 M. Harrison, MA, D.Phil., Fellow of Green College: Professor of the History of Medicine
 G.M. Henderson, MA, Fellow of University College: Professor of Earth Sciences
 S.P. Hesselbo, MA, Fellow of St Peter's College: Professor of Stratigraphy
 D.M. Hodgson, MA, Fellow of Oriel College: Professor of Chemistry
 J.C.N. Horder, BCL, MA, D.Phil., Fellow of Worcester College: Professor of Criminal Law
 C.J. Howgego, MA, D.Phil., Fellow of Wolfson College: Professor of Greek and Roman Numismatics
 W.S. James, MA, D.Phil., Fellow of Brasenose College: Professor of Virology
 A. Jefferson, MA, D.Phil., Fellow of New College: Professor of French Literature
 T.J. Jenkinson, MA, M.Phil., D.Phil., Fellow of Keble College: Professor of Finance
 J. Johns, MA, D.Phil., Fellow of Wolfson College: Professor of the Art and Archaeology of the Islamic Mediterranean
 J.A. Jones, MA, D.Phil., Fellow of Brasenose College: Professor of Physics
 P. Kennedy, MA status, Fellow of Harris Manchester College: Professor of Clinical Psychology
 Y.F. Khong, MA, Fellow of Nuffield College: Professor of International Relations
 A.I. Kirkland, Fellow of Linacre: Professor of Materials (Image Analysis) with effect from 1 October 2005
 P. Klenerman, BM, B.Ch., D.Phil., Fellow of Brasenose College: Professor of Immunology
 A.M. Korsunsky, MA, D.Phil., Fellow of Trinity College: Professor of Engineering Science
 D. Kramkov, Professor of Mathematical Finance with effect from 1 January 2007
 H. Kraus, MA, Fellow of Corpus Christi College: Professor of Physics
 M. Lackenby, MA, D.Phil., Fellow of St Catherine's College: Professor of Mathematics
 J.A. Langdale, MA, Fellow of Queen's College: Professor of Plant Development
 M. Leigh, MA, Fellow of St Anne's College: Professor of Classical Languages and Literature
 G.R. Lock, MA status, Fellow of Kellogg College: Professor of Archaeology
 E. Macaro, MA, Fellow of Worcester College: Professor of Applied Linguistics and Second Language Acquisition
 J. McDonagh, MA, Fellow of Linacre College: Professor of Victorian Literature
 G.A.T. McVean, MA, Fellow of Linacre: Professor of Statistical Genetics with effect from 1 October 2006
 J.A. Mee, MA, Fellow of University College: Professor of English Literature of the Romantic Period
 P. Mitchell, MA, D.Phil., Fellow of St Hugh's College: Professor of African Archaeology
 R. Mott: Professor of Bioinformatics and Statistical Genetics
 P. Mountford, MA, D.Phil., Fellow of St Edmund Hall: Professor of Chemistry
 L.C. Mugglestone, MA, D.Phil., Fellow of Pembroke College: Professor of History of English
 K.A. Nation, Fellow of St John's College: Professor of Experimental Psychology
 A.C. Nobre, MA, Fellow of New College: Professor of Cognitive Neuroscience
 F. Nosten: Professor of Tropical Medicine
 R. Patient: Professor of Developmental Genetics
 P. Podsiadlowski, MA, Fellow of St Edmund Hall: Professor of Physics
 H.A. Priestley, MA, D.Phil., Fellow of St Anne's College: Professor of Mathematics
 J. K.-H. Quah, MA, Fellow of St Hugh's College: Professor of Economic Theory
 C.B. Ramsey, MA, D.Phil.: Professor of Archaeological Science
 J.V. Roberts, Fellow of Worcester College: Professor of Criminology
 S.G. Roberts, MA, Fellow of St Edmund Hall: Professor of Materials
 E.J. Robertson, MA: Professor of Developmental Biology
 C.F. Robinson, MA, Fellow of Wolfson College: Professor of Islamic History
 P.F. Roche, MA status, Fellow of Hertford College: Professor of Physics
 F.D. Rueda, MA, Fellow of Merton College: Professor of Comparative Politics
 S. Sarkar, MA, Fellow of Linacre College: Professor of Physics
 D. Sarooshi, Fellow of Queen's College: Professor of Public International Law
 Q.J. Sattentau, MA, Fellow of Magdalen College: Professor of Immunology
 E. Savage-Smith, MA status, Fellow of St Cross College: Professor of the History of Islamic Science
 A.D. Scott, Fellow of Merton College: Professor of Mathematics
 C.J. Spence, MA, Fellow of Somerville College: Professor of Experimental Psychology
 C.R. Stone, MA, D.Phil., Fellow of Somerville College: Professor of Engineering Science
 P.H. Taylor, MA, Fellow of Keble College: Professor of Engineering Science
 D.A. Terrar, MA, Fellow of Worcester College: Professor of Cardiac Electrophysiology
 A.L.R. Thomas, MA, Fellow of Lady Margaret Hall: Professor of Biomechanics
 M. Van De Mieroop, Fellow of Wolfson College: Professor of Assyriology
 F. Varese, MA, D.Phil., Fellow of Linacre College: Professor of Criminology
 J. Welsh, M.Phil., MA, D.Phil., Fellow of Somerville College: Professor of International Relations
 M.C. Whitby, MA status: Professor of Molecular Genetics
 S.D. Whitefield, MA, D.Phil., Fellow of Pembroke: Professor of Comparative Russian and East European Politics and Societies with effect from 1 July 2006
 S.J. Whittaker, BCL, MA, D.Phil., Fellow of St John's College: Professor of European Comparative Law
 K.J. Willis, MA, Fellow of Jesus College: Professor of Long-Term Ecology
 T. Witelski, Fellow-elect of St Catherine's: Professor of Applied Mathematics with effect from 1 August 2007
 J. Wright, MA, D.Phil., Student of Christ Church: Professor of International Relations
 R. Zetter, MA, Fellow of Green College: Professor of Refugee Studies with effect from 1 October 2006
 J. Zielonka, MA, Fellow of St Antony's College: Professor of European Politics
 A.A.S. Zuckerman, MA, Fellow of University College: Professor of Civil Procedure

2004 
The following were awarded the title of Professor by the University in 2004:

 Dr H. L. Anderson, Keble College: Professor of Chemistry
 Dr D. G. Andrews, Lady Margaret Hall: Professor of Physics
 Mr T. Z. Aziz: Professor of Neurosurgery
 Dr R. N. E. Barton, Hertford College: Professor of Archaeology
 Dr D. M. W. Beeson: Professor of Neuroscience
 Dr S. Bhattacharya: Professor of Cardiovascular Medicine
 Dr R. Bicknell: Professor of Cancer Cell Biology
 Dr S. J. Blundell, Mansfield College: Professor of Physics
 Mr E. L. Bowie, Corpus Christi College: Professor of Classical Languages and Literature
 Mr A. Briggs, St Edmund Hall: Professor of Private International Law
 Dr M. Brown, St Peter's College: Professor of Musculoskeletal Science
 Mr M. J. Clarke: Professor of Clinical Epidemiology
 Dr S. J. Davis: Professor of Molecular Immunology
 Dr J. Day, Lady Margaret Hall: Professor of Old Testament Theology
 Dr T. J. Donohoe, Magdalen College: Professor of Chemistry
 Dr J. A. Endicott, St Cross College: Professor of Structural Biology
 Dr T. Enver: Professor of Molecular Haematology
 Dr M. Farrall, Keble College: Professor of Cardiovascular Genetics
 Dr P. R. Franklin, St Catherine's College: Professor of Music
 Dr L. Fugger: Professor of Clinical Immunology
 Mr T. Garton Ash, St Antony's College: Professor of European Studies
 Dr D. J. Gavaghan, New College: Professor of Computational Biology
 Mr G. Gibbs: Professor of Teaching and Learning in Higher Education
 Dr V. A. Gillespie, St Anne's College: Professor of English Language and Literature
 Dr P. Glasziou, Kellogg College: Professor of Evidence-based Medicine
 Dr C. H. Gosden, St Cross College: Professor of Archaeology
 Dr C. R. M. Grovenor, St Anne's College: Professor of Materials
 Professor K. Gull, Lincoln College: Professor of Molecular Microbiology
 Dr S. J. Gurr, Somerville College: Professor of Molecular Plant Pathology
 Dr P. A. Handford, St Catherine's College: Professor of Biochemistry
 Dr S. J. Harrison, Corpus Christi College: Professor of Classical Languages and Literature
 Dr K. O. Hawkins, Oriel College: Professor of Law and Society
 Dr K. J. Humphries, All Souls College: Professor of Economic History
 Dr P. T. Ireland, St Anne's College: Professor of Engineering Science
 Dr D. G. Jackson: Professor of Human Immunology
 Dr P. Jeavons, St Anne's College: Professor of Computer Science
 Dr A. Jephcoat: Visiting Professor of Earth Sciences
 Dr T. Key: Professor of Epidemiology
 Dr A. J. King, Merton College: Professor of Neurophysiology
 Dr D. W. Macdonald, Lady Margaret Hall: Professor of Wildlife Conservation
 Dr M. C. J. Maiden: Professor of Molecular Epidemiology
 Dr H. J. Mardon, St Catherine's College: Professor of Reproductive Science
 Mr N. J. Mayhew, St Cross College: Professor of Numismatics and Monetary History
 Dr D. J. McBarnet, Wolfson College: Professor of Socio-legal Studies
 Dr A. R. McLean, St Catherine's College: Professor of Mathematical Biology Dr T.F. Melham, Balliol College: Professor of Computer Science
 Dr A. W. Moore, St Hugh's College: Professor of Philosophy
 Dr M. F. Murphy: Professor of Blood Transfusion Medicine
 Dr H. A. W. Neil, Wolfson College: Professor of Clinical Epidemiology
 Dr L. A. Newlyn, St Edmund Hall: Professor of English Language and Literature
 Dr M. E. M. Noble: Professor of Structural Biology
 Mr M. W. J. Noble, Green College: Professor of Social Policy
 Dr D. Nowell, Christ Church Professor of Engineering Science
 Dr C. H. L. Ong, Merton College: Professor of Computer Science
 Dr M. J. Parker, St Cross College: Professor of Bioethics
 Dr F. Powrie: Professor of Immunology
 Dr S. G. Rawlings, St Peter's College: Professor of Physics
 Dr G. Reinert, Keble College: Professor of Statistics
 Dr P. B. Renton: Professor of Physics
 Dr S. J. Roberts, Somerville College: Professor of Information Engineering
 Dr M. A. Robinson: Professor of Environmental Archaeology
 Dr L. A. Roper, Balliol College: Professor of Early Modern History
 Dr P. M. Rothwell: Professor of Clinical Neurology
 Dr I. L. Sargent, Mansfield College: Professor of Reproductive Science
 Dr M. J. Smith, University College: Professor of Egyptology
 Dr D. K. Stammers: Professor of Structural Biology
 Dr E. Swyngedouw, St Peter's College: Professor of Geography
 Dr D. P. Taggart: Professor of Cardiovascular Surgery
 Dr S. Ulijaszek, St Cross College: Professor of Human Ecology
 Dr P. Wentworth: Professor of Medicinal Chemistry
 Dr R. K. Westbrook, St Hugh's College: Professor of Operations Management
 Dr R. J. Whittaker, St Edmund Hall: Professor of Biogeography
 Dr J. M. G. Williams: Professor of Clinical Psychology
 Dr J. S. Wilson: Professor of Mathematics
 Dr W. G. Wood: Professor of Haematology
 Dr D. Zancani, Balliol College: Professor of Italian

2002 
The following were awarded the title of Professor by the University in October 2002:

 Dr M. Airs, Kellogg College: Professor of Conservation and the Historic Environment
 Dr R.C. Allen, Nuffield College: Professor of Economic History
 Dr M.J. Banks, Wolfson College: Professor of Visual Anthropology
 Dr P. Battle, St Catherine's College: Professor of Chemistry
 Dr A.G.L. Borthwick, St Edmund Hall: Professor of Engineering Science
 Dr M.D. Brasier, St Edmund Hall: Professor of Palaeobiology
 Dr L.W.B. Brockliss, Magdalen College: Professor of Early Modern French History
 Dr L.R. Cardon: Professor of Bioinformatics
 Dr S. Castles, Green College: Professor of Migration and Refugee Studies
 Dr M. Ceadel, New College: Professor of Politics
 Dr A. Cerezo, Wolfson College: Professor of Materials
 Dr K. Channon, Lady Margaret Hall: Professor of Cardiovascular Medicine
 Ms M. Chevska, Brasenose College: Professor of Fine Art
 Dr K. Clarke: Professor of Physiological Biochemistry
 Dr D.A. Coleman: Professor of Demography
 Dr A. Cooper: Professor of Ancient Biomolecules
 Dr O. de Moor, Magdalen College: Professor of Computer Science
 Dr A.L. Dexter, Worcester College: Professor of Engineering Science
 Dr M. du Sautoy, All Souls College: Professor of Mathematics
 Professor M.J. Earl, Templeton College: Professor of Information Management
 Dr G.A. Evans, Nuffield College: Professor of the Sociology of Politics
 Dr E. Fallaize, St John's College: Professor of French
 Dr P.S. Fiddes, Regent's Park College: Professor of Systematic Theology
 Dr R.W. Fiddian, Wadham College: Professor of Spanish
 Dr J. Flint: Professor of Molecular Psychiatry
 Dr C.J. Foot, St Peter's College: Professor of Physics
 Dr S. Fuller: Professor of Macromolecular Structure and Assembly
 Dr A. Galione, New College: Professor of Pharmacology
 Dr D. Gambetta, All Souls College: Professor of Sociology
 Dr J. Geddes: Professor of Epidemiological Psychiatry
 Dr G.F. Gibbons: Professor of Human Metabolism
 Dr R.N. Gildea, Merton College: Professor of Modern French History
 Dr M. Goldacre, Magdalen College: Professor of Public Health
 Dr A.M. Gray: Professor of Health Economics
 Dr G.M. Griffiths: Professor of Experimental Pathology
 Dr N. Harnew, St Anne's College: Professor of Physics
 Dr M. Hewstone, New College: Professor of Social Psychology
 Dr P.J. Hore, Corpus Christi College: Professor of Chemistry
 Dr P.W. Jeffreys, Keble College: Professor of Computing
 Dr C. Jenkinson: Professor of Health Services Research
 Dr N.F. Johnson, Lincoln College: Professor of Physics
 Dr D.D. Joyce, Lincoln College: Professor of Mathematics
 Dr C. Kelly, New College: Professor of Russian
 Dr D.C. Kurtz, Wolfson College: Professor of Classical Art
 Dr D.R. Matthews, Harris Manchester College: Professor of Diabetic Medicine
 Dr R. McCabe, Merton College: Professor of English Language and Literature
 Dr R.C. Miall: Professor of Neuroscience
 Dr D. Miller, Nuffield College: Professor of Political Theory
 Dr S. Neubauer, Christ Church: Professor of Cardiovascular Medicine
 Dr J.A. Noble, Oriel College: Professor of Engineering Science
 Dr A.B. Parekh, Keble College: Professor of Physiology
 Dr B.E. Parsons, St Cross College: Professor of Geodesy and Geophysics
 Dr D.J. Paterson, Merton College: Professor of Cardiovascular Physiology
 Dr A.K. Petford-Long, Corpus Christi College: Professor of Materials
 Dr C.P. Ponting: Professor of Bioinformatics
 Dr J. Poulton, Lady Margaret Hall: Professor of Mitochondrial Genetics
 Dr C.W. Pugh, Green College: Professor of Renal Medicine
 Dr S.E. Randolph, Oriel College: Professor of Parasite Ecology
 Professor S. Rayner: Professor of Science in Society
 Dr P.L. Read, Trinity College: Professor of Physics
 Dr D. Roberts, Trinity College: Professor of Haematology
 Dr D.B. Robertson, St Hugh's College: Professor of Politics
 Dr J.W. Sear, Green College: Professor of Anaesthetics
 Dr R.J. Service, St Antony's College: Professor of Russian History
 Dr A.G. Sherratt, Linacre College: Professor of Archaeology
 Dr G.C. Sills, St Catherine's College: Professor of Engineering Science
 Dr T.P. Softley, Merton College: Professor of Chemical Physics
 Dr A.M. Steane, Exeter College: Professor of Physics
 Dr K. Sutherland, St Anne's College: Professor of Bibliography and Textual Criticism
 Mr C.C.W. Taylor, Corpus Christi College: Professor of Philosophy
 Dr A.J. Turberfield, Magdalen College: Professor of Physics
 Dr S. Vertovec, Linacre College: Professor of Transnational Anthropology
 Dr M. Vickers, Jesus College: Professor of Archaeology
 Dr R. Whittington, New College: Professor of Strategic Management
 Dr M.H. Worthington: Professor of Geophysics
 Dr D. Wu, St Catherine's College: Professor of English Language and Literature
 Dr J.M. Yeomans, St Hilda's College: Professor of Physics

2000 
The following were awarded the title of Professor in September 2000:

 T. Cavalier-Smith: Professor of Evolutionary Biology
 K.P. Day, MA, Fellow of Hertford College: Professor of Molecular Epidemiology
 L.C. Mahadevan, MA, Fellow of Trinity College: Professor of Biochemistry
 R.G. Ratcliffe, MA, D.Phil., Fellow of New College: Professor of Plant Sciences
 A.J. Carr: Professor in Orthopaedic Surgery
 V. Cerundolo, MA, Fellow of Merton College: Professor of Immunology
 T.J. Elliott, MA: Professor in Immunology
 D.J.P. Ferguson, MA status: Professor of Ultrastructural Morphology
 D.W.R. Gray, MA, D.Phil., Fellow of Oriel College: Professor of Experimental Surgery
 P.J. Harrison, DM, Fellow of Wolfson College: Professor of Psychiatry
 R.A. Hope, MA, Fellow of St Cross College: Professor of Medical Ethics
 N.J. Mortensen, MA status: Professor of Colorectal Surgery
 S.L. Rowland-Jones, MA, D.Phil., Student of Christ Church: Professor of Immunology
 R.W. Snow: Professor of Tropical Public Health
 J.T. Triffitt, MA status: Professor of Bone Metabolism
 A.O.M. Wilkie, DM: Professor of Genetics
 D. Phillips, MA, D.Phil., Fellow of St Edmund Hall: Professor of Comparative Education
 I. Walford, MA, M.Phil., Fellow of Green College: Professor of Education Policy
 I. Rivers, Fellow of St Hugh's College: Professor of English Language and Literature
 R.C. Griffiths, MA, Fellow of Lady Margaret Hall: Professor of Mathematical Genetics
 U. Tillmann, MA, Fellow of Merton College: Professor of Mathematics
 J.C.P. Woodcock, MA, Fellow of Kellogg College: Professor of Software Engineering
 A.M. Finch, MA, D.Phil., Fellow of Merton College: Professor of French
 N. Ferguson, MA, D.Phil., Fellow of Jesus College: Professor of Political and Financial History
 A.J. Nicholls, B.Phil., MA, Fellow of St Antony's College: Professor of Modern German History
 J. Rawson, MA, D.Litt., Fellow of Merton College: Professor of Chinese Art and Archaeology
 J.T. Chalker, MA, D.Phil., Fellow of St Hugh's College: Professor of Physics
 R.C. Darton, Fellow of Hertford College: Professor of Engineering Science
 R.G. Edgell, MA, D.Phil., Fellow of Trinity College: Professor of Inorganic Chemistry
 N.A. Jelley, MA, D.Phil., Fellow of Lincoln College: Professor of Physics
 D.M.P. Mingos, MA, Fellow of St Edmund Hall: Professor of Chemistry
 J.S. Wark, MA, Fellow of Trinity College: Professor of Physics
 G. Hale: Professor of Therapeutic Immunology
 D.R. Moore: Professor of Auditory Neuroscience
 D.B. Sattelle: Professor of Molecular Neurobiology
 P.A. van der Merwe, MA, Fellow of Trinity College: Professor of Molecular Immunology
 R.M.A. Martin, MA, D.Phil., Fellow of St Edmund Hall: Professor of Abnormal Psychology
 B.D. Catling, MA, Fellow of Linacre College: Professor of Fine Art
 D. Firth, MA, Fellow of Nuffield College: Professor of Social Statistics
 D.A. Vines, MA, D.Phil., Fellow of Balliol College: Professor of Economics
 C.M. Tuckett, MA, Fellow of Wolfson College: Professor of New Testament Studies

1999
The following were awarded the title of Professor in September 1999:

 K. Drickamer: Professor of Biochemistry
 A. Grafen, MA, D.Phil., Fellow of St John's College: Professor of Theoretical Biology
 D.J. Rogers, MA, D.Phil., Fellow of Green College: Professor of Ecology
 M.S.P. Sansom, MA, D.Phil., Student of Christ Church: Professor of Molecular Biophysics
 J.M. Austyn, MA, D.Phil., Fellow of Wolfson College: Professor of Immunobiology
 D.B. Dunger, MA status: Professor of Paediatric Endocrinology
 K.N. Frayn, MA status, Fellow of Green College: Professor of Human Metabolism
 A. Harris, MA, Fellow of St Cross College: Professor of Paediatric Molecular Genetics
 P.C. Harris: Professor of Medical Genetics
 I.D. Hickson: Professor of Molecular Oncology
 D.P. Jewell, BM, MA, D.Phil., Fellow of Green College: Professor of Gastroenterology
 E.Y. Jones, MA, D.Phil.: Professor of Protein Crystallography
 H.J. McQuay, MA, DM, Fellow of Balliol College: Professor of Pain Relief
 D. Murray, MA status: Professor of Orthopaedic Surgery
 T.E.A. Peto, BM, MA, D.Phil.: Professor of Medicine
 P. Salkovskis, MA: Professor of Cognitive Psychology
 A.H.R.W. Simpson, MA, DM, Fellow of St Peter's College: Professor of Orthopaedic Surgery
 G. Stores, MA, Fellow of Linacre College: Professor of Child and Adolescent Psychiatry
 J.R. Stradling, MA status: Professor of Respiratory Medicine
 D.T. Wade, MA status: Professor of Neurological Disability
 A.E. Wakefield, MA, D.Phil., Fellow of Merton College: Professor of Infectious Diseases
 F.T. Wojnarowska, BM, MA, M.Sc.: Professor of Dermatology
 R. Hanna, MA, Fellow of Keble College: Professor of Palaeography
 R.J.C. Young, MA, D.Phil., Fellow of Wadham College: Professor of English and Critical Theory
 S.D. Fredman, BCL, MA, Fellow of Exeter College: Professor of Law
 J.C. McCrudden, MA, D.Phil., Fellow of Lincoln College: Professor of Human Rights Law
 R.H.A. Jenkyns, MA, M.Litt., Fellow of Lady Margaret Hall: Professor of the Classical Tradition
 A.W. Lintott, MA, D.Litt., Fellow of Worcester College: Professor of Roman History
 R.O.A.M. Lyne, MA, D.Phil., Fellow of Balliol College: Professor of Classical Languages and Literature
 C.J.K. Batty, MA, M.Sc., D.Phil., Fellow of St John's College: Professor of Analysis
 M.R. Bridson, MA, Fellow of Pembroke College: Professor of Topology
 E. Süli, MA, Fellow of Linacre: Professor of Numerical Analysis
 K.P. Tod, MA, M.Sc., D.Phil., Fellow of St John's College: Professor of Mathematical Physics
 H.M. Brown, B. Litt., MA, Fellow of St Hilda's College: Professor of German
 C.M. Howells, MA, Fellow of Wadham College: Professor of French
 R.N.N. Robertson, MA, D.Phil., Fellow of St John's College: Professor of German
 H. Watanabe-O'Kelly, MA, Fellow of Exeter College: Professor of German Literature
 P.A. Slack, MA, D.Phil., Fellow of Linacre College: Professor of Early Modern Social History
 J.A. Caldwell, B.Mus., MA, D.Phil.: Professor of Music
 F.A. Armstrong, MA, Fellow of St John's College: Professor of Chemistry
 G.A.D. Briggs, MA, Fellow of Wolfson College: Professor of Materials
 R.W. Daniel, MA, Fellow of Brasenose College: Professor of Engineering Science
 J.S. Foord, MA, Fellow of St Catherine's College: Professor of Chemistry
 J.C. Green, MA, D.Phil., Fellow of St Hugh's College: Professor of Chemistry
 B. Kouvaritakis, MA, Fellow of St Edmund Hall: Professor of Engineering Science
 M.L.G. Oldfield, MA, D.Phil., Fellow of Keble College: Professor of Engineering Science
 C.V. Robinson, Fellow of Wolfson College: Professor of Chemistry
 A.P. Zisserman, MA status: Professor of Engineering Science
 D.V.M. Bishop, MA, D.Phil.: Professor of Developmental Neuropsychology
 S. Lall, B.Phil., MA, Fellow of Green College: Professor of Development Economics
 N. Shephard, MA, Fellow of Nuffield College: Professor of Economics
 A.E. McGrath, MA, D.Phil., Fellow of Wycliffe Hall: Professor of Historical Theology

1998 
The following were awarded the title of Professor in October 1998:

 S.J. Simpson, MA, Fellow of Jesus College: Professor of Entomology
 D.G. Altman: Professor of Statistics in Medicine
 W.O.C.M. Cookson, MA, Fellow of Green College: Professor of Genetics
 T.J. Crow: Professor of Psychiatry
 R.R. Holman, MA status: Professor of Diabetic Medicine
 R. Jacoby, MA, Fellow of Linacre College: Professor of Old Age Psychiatry
 D. Kwiatkowski, MA: Professor of Tropical Paediatrics
 P.M. Matthews, MA, MD, D.Phil., Fellow of St Edmund Hall: Professor of Neurology
 K.R. Mills, MA, Fellow of Green College: Professor of Clinical Neurophysiology
 A.C. Vincent, MA, Fellow of Somerville College: Professor of Neuroimmunology
 J.S. Wainscoat, MA status: Professor of Haematology
 J.A.H. Wass, MA, Fellow of Green College: Professor of Endocrinology
 H.N.A. Willcox, MA status: Professor of Neurosciences
 B.P. Wordsworth, MA, Fellow of Green College: Professor of Rheumatology
 K. Sylva, MA, Fellow of Jesus College: Professor of Educational Psychology
 R. Bowlby, MA, Fellow of St Hilda's College: Professor of English Language and Literature
 M. Butler, MA, D.Phil., Fellow of Exeter College: Professor of English Language and Literature
 K. Duncan-Jones, B.Litt., MA, Fellow of Somerville College: Professor of English Language and Literature
 G.S. Goodwin-Gill, MA, D.Phil., Fellow of Wolfson College: Professor of International Refugee Law
 A.M. Cameron, MA, Fellow of Keble College: Professor of Late Antique and Byzantine History
 G.O. Hutchinson, MA, D.Phil., Fellow of Exeter College: Professor of Greek and Latin Languages and Literature
 G. Friesecke, MA, Fellow of St Catherine's College: Professor of Mathematics
 P.K. Maini, MA, D.Phil., Fellow of Brasenose College: Professor of Mathematical Biology
 C.J.H. McDiarmid, MA, M.Sc., D.Phil., Fellow of Corpus Christi College: Professor of Combinatorics
 R.A. Cooper, MA, D.Phil., Fellow of Brasenose College: Professor of French
 P.R.J. Hainsworth, MA, Fellow of Lady Margaret Hall: Professor of Italian
 R. Sharpe, MA, Fellow of Wadham College: Professor of Diplomatic
 N.L. Stepan, MA: Professor of Modern History
 D.B. Abraham, MA, D.Sc., Fellow of Wolfson College: Professor of Statistical Mechanics
 R.W. Ainsworth, MA, D.Phil., Fellow of St Catherine's College: Professor of Engineering Science
 P.D. Beer, MA, Fellow of Wadham College: Professor of Chemistry
 B.J. Bellhouse, MA, D.Phil., Fellow of Magdalen College: Professor of Engineering Science
 J.R. Dilworth, MA, Fellow of St Anne's College: Professor of Chemistry
 D.J. Edwards, MA, Fellow of Wadham College: Professor of Engineering Science
 A.K. Ekert, MA, D.Phil., Fellow of Merton College: Professor of Physics
 D.A. Hills, MA, Fellow of Lincoln College: Professor of Engineering Science
 B.J. Howard, MA, Fellow of Pembroke College: Professor of Chemistry
 C.J. Knowles: Professor of Engineering Science
 D.M. O'Hare, MA, D.Phil., Fellow of Balliol College: Professor of Chemistry
 C.J. Schofield, MA, D.Phil., Fellow of Hertford College: Professor of Chemistry
 A.N. Barclay, MA, D.Phil.: Professor of Molecular Immunology
 D.W. Mason, BM, MA status: Professor of Cellular Immunology
 P. Robbins, BM, MA, D.Phil., Fellow of Queen's College: Professor of Physiology
 G. Claridge, MA, Fellow of Magdalen College: Professor of Abnormal Psychology
 P.L. Harris, MA, D.Phil., Fellow of St John's College: Professor of Developmental Psychology
 K.R. Plunkett, MA, Fellow of St Hugh's College: Professor of Cognitive Neuroscience
 J.N.P. Rawlins, MA, D.Phil., Fellow of University College: Professor of Behavioural Neuroscience
 P.A. David, MA, Fellow of All Souls College: Professor of Economics and Economic History
 B. Harriss-White, MA, Fellow of Wolfson College: Professor of Development Studies

1997 
The following were awarded the title of Professor in September 1997:

 C.G. Clarke, MA, D.Phil., Fellow of Jesus: Professor of Urban and Social Geography
 D.A. Roe, MA, D.Litt., Fellow of St Cross: Professor of Palaeolithic Archaeology
 N.H. Gale, MA, Fellow of Nuffield:Professor of Archaeological Science
 L.A. Casselton, MA, Fellow of St Cross: Professor of Fungal Genetics
 M.E.S. Dawkins, MA, D.Phil., Fellow of Somerville: Professor of Animal Behaviour
 A. Kacelnik, MA, D.Phil., Fellow of Pembroke: Professor of Behavioural Ecology
 S.M. Kingsman, MA, Fellow of Trinity: Professor of Molecular Genetics
 M.A. Nowak, MA, MA status, Fellow of Keble: Professor of Mathematical Biology
 P. Roy, Professor of Molecular Virology
 P. Styles, MA status, D.Phil.: Professor of Clinical Magnetic Resonance
 M.D. Yudkin, MA, D.Phil., Fellow of Kellogg: Professor of Biochemistry
 C.J.K. Bulstrode, BM, MA, Fellow of Green College: Professor of Orthopaedic Surgery
 P.J. Cowen, MA status: Professor of Psychopharmacology
 S.C. Darby, MA status: Professor of Medical Statistics
 K.C. Gatter, BM, MA, D.Phil., Fellow of St John's: Professor of Pathology
 C.E.W. Hahn, MA, D.Phil., Fellow of Green College: Professor of Anaesthetic Science
 J.J. Harding, MA status: Professor of Ocular Biochemistry
 K. Marsh, Professor of Tropical Medicine
 J.C. Marshall, MA: Professor of Neuropsychology
 D.Y. Mason, DM, Fellow of Pembroke: Professor of Cellular Pathology
 R.A. Mayou, BM, MA, M.Sc., Fellow of Nuffield: Professor of Psychiatry
 A.P. Monaco, MA status: Professor of Human Genetics
 C.I. Newbold, MA, D.Phil.: Professor of Tropical Medicine
 N.N. Osborne, MA, Fellow of Green College: Professor of Ocular Neurobiology
 R.E. Phillips, MA, Fellow of Wolfson: Professor of Clinical Medicine
 B.C. Sykes, MA, Fellow of Wolfson: Professor of Human Genetics
 D. Tarin, MA, DM, Fellow of Green College: Professor of Pathology
 A.R. Wilkinson, MA status, Fellow of All Souls: Professor of Paediatrics
 I.C. Butler, MA, Student of Christ Church: Professor of English Language and Literature
 P.F. Cane, BCL, MA, Fellow of Corpus Christi: Professor of Law
 M. Giles, MA, Fellow of St Hugh's: Professor of Computational Fluid Dynamics
 A.W. Roscoe, MA, D.Phil., Fellow of University College: Professor of Computing Science
 D. Segal, MA, Fellow of All Souls: Professor of Mathematics
 R.A.G. Pearson, MA, D.Phil., Fellow of Queen's: Professor of French
 M. Biddle, MA, Fellow of Hertford: Professor of Medieval Archaeology
 R. Parker, MA, Fellow of St Hugh's: Professor of Music
 A. Jones, MA, Fellow of Pembroke: Professor of Classical Arabic
 D.L.T. Anderson, MA, Fellow of Wolfson: Professor of Physics
 J.H.D. Eland, MA, D.Phil., Fellow of Worcester: Professor of Physical Chemistry
 P. Ewart, MA, Fellow of Worcester: Professor of Physics
 G.W.J. Fleet, MA, D.Phil., Fellow of St John's: Professor of Chemistry
 D.W. Murray, MA, D.Phil., Fellow of St Anne's: Professor of Engineering Science
 J.D. Silver, MA, D.Phil., Fellow of New College: Professor of Physics
 A.P. Sutton, MA, Fellow of Linacre: Professor of Materials Science
 N.W. Tanner, MA, Fellow of Hertford: Professor of Physics
 A.M. Tsvelik, MA, Fellow of Brasenose: Professor of Physics
 J.P. Bolam, MA status: Professor of Anatomical Neuropharmacology
 J. Errington, MA, Fellow of Magdalen: Professor of Microbiology
 M.R. Matthews, B.Sc., MA, DM, Fellow of Lady Margaret Hall: Professor of Human Anatomy
 R.D. Vaughan-Jones, MA, Fellow of Exeter: Professor of Cellular Physiology
 N.P. Emler, MA, Fellow of Wolfson: Professor of Social Psychology
 R.E. Passingham, MA, Fellow of Wadham: Professor of Cognitive Neuroscience
 R.J. Foot, MA, Fellow of St Antony's: Professor of International Relations
 M.S. Freeden, MA status, D.Phil., Fellow of Mansfield: Professor of Politics
 J.N.J. Muellbauer, MA, Fellow of Nuffield: Professor of Economics
 A.J. Ryan, MA, D.Litt., Warden of New College: Professor of Politics
 D.N.J. MacCulloch, MA, D.Phil., Fellow of St Cross: Professor of the History of the Church

1996 
The title of professor was conferred on the following in July 1996:

 I.J.R. Aitchison, MA, D.Phil., Fellow of Worcester: Professor of Physics 
 J.E. Allen, MA, D.Sc., Fellow of University: Professor of Engineering Science
 J.W. Allan, MA, D.Phil., Fellow of St Cross: Professor of Eastern Art
 W.W.M. Allison, MA, D.Phil., Fellow of Keble: Professor of Physics
 D.A. Allport, MA, Fellow of St Anne's: Professor of Experimental Psychology
 S. Anand, B.Phil., MA, D.Phil., Fellow of St Catherine's: Professor of Economics
 J.P. Armitage, MA, Fellow of St Hilda's: Professor of Biochemistry
 P.W. Atkins, MA, Fellow of Lincoln: Professor of Chemistry
 F.M. Ashcroft, MA, D.Phil., Fellow of Trinity: Professor of Physiology
 C.C. Ashley, MA, D.Sc., Fellow of Corpus Christi: Professor of Physiology
 M.R. Ayers, MA, Fellow of Wadham: Professor of Philosophy
 M.O.L. Bacharach, MA, D.Phil., Student of Christ Church: Professor of Economics
 J.M. Baker, MA, D.Phil., Fellow of Merton: Professor of Physics
 R.H. Barnes, B.Litt., MA, D.Phil., Fellow of St Antony's: Professor of Social Anthropology
 V. Beral, MA, Fellow of Green College: Professor of Epidemiology
 J.J. Binney, MA, D.Phil., Fellow of Merton: Professor of Physics
 R.S. Bird, MA, Fellow of Lincoln: Professor of Computing Science
 J.A. Blake, MA, Fellow of Exeter: Professor of Engineering Science
 V.B. Bogdanor, MA, Fellow of Brasenose: Professor of Politics
 A.F. Brading, MA, Fellow of Lady Margaret Hall: Professor of Pharmacology
 J.M. Brown, MA, Fellow of Exeter: Professor of Chemistry
 D.A.P. Bundy, MA, Fellow of Linacre: Professor of Zoology
 J. Burley, MA, Fellow of Green College: Professor of Forestry
 K. Burnett, MA, D.Phil., Fellow of St John's: Professor of Physics
 J. Campbell, MA, Fellow of Worcester: Professor of Modern History
 J.L. Cardy, MA, Fellow of All Souls: Professor of Physics
 P.A. Charles, MA, Fellow of St Hugh's: Professor of Physics
 D.M. Clark, MA, D.Phil., Fellow of University: Professor of Psychiatry
 J.B. Clegg, MA status: Professor of Molecular Medicine
 R.E. Collins, MA, M.Sc.: Professor of Cardiology
 R.G. Compton, MA, D.Phil., Fellow of St John's: Professor of Chemistry
 P.R. Cook, MA, D.Phil., Fellow of Brasenose: Professor of Cell Biology
 E.H. Cooper, MA, Fellow of University: Professor of English Language and Literature
 I.W. Craig, MA, Fellow of St Catherine's: Professor of Genetics
 P.P. Craig, BCL, MA, Fellow of Worcester: Professor of Law
 R.J. Crampton, MA, Fellow of St Edmund Hall: Professor of East European History
 C.J. Crouch, MA, D.Phil., Fellow of Trinity: Professor of Sociology
 V.D. Cunningham, MA, D.Phil., Fellow of Corpus Christi: Professor of English Language and Literature
 M.K. Davies, B.Phil., MA, D.Phil., Fellow of Corpus Christi: Professor of Philosophy
 P.L. Davies, MA, Fellow of Balliol: Professor of Law
 S.G. Davies, MA, D.Phil., Fellow of New College: Professor of Chemistry
 C.R. Dawkins, MA, D.Phil., D.Sc., Fellow of New College: Professor of the Public Understanding of Science
 R.G. Denning, MA, D.Phil., Fellow of Magdalen: Professor of Chemistry
 R.C.E. Devenish, MA, Fellow of Hertford: Professor of Physics
 D. Dew-Hughes, MA, D.Sc., Fellow of University: Professor of Engineering Science
 C.M. Dobson, MA, D.Phil., Fellow of Lady Margaret Hall: Professor of Chemistry
 P.J. Dobson, MA, Fellow of Queen's: Professor of Engineering Science
 A.J. Downs, MA, D.Phil., Fellow of Jesus: Professor of Chemistry
 K.G.H. Dyke, MA, Fellow of Wadham: Professor of Microbiology
 D.T. Edmonds, MA, D.Phil., Fellow of Wadham: Professor of Physics
 J.C. Ellory, MA, Fellow of Corpus Christi: Professor of Physiology
 M.M. Esiri, DM, Fellow of St Hugh's: Professor of Neuropathology
 C.G. Fairburn, MA, DM: Professor of Psychiatry
 S.J. Ferguson, MA, D.Phil., Fellow of St Edmund Hall: Professor of Biochemistry
 R.M. Fitzpatrick, MA, Fellow of Nuffield: Professor of R.M. Fitzpatrick
 G.H. Fowler, BM, MA, Fellow of Balliol: Professor of General Practice
 D.G. Fraser, MA, D.Phil., Fellow of Worcester: Professor of Earth Sciences
 M.R. Freedland, MA, D.Phil., Fellow of St John's: Professor of Law
 D.I.D. Gallie, MA, D.Phil., Fellow of Nuffield: Professor of Sociology
 S.C. Gill, B.Phil., MA, Fellow of Lincoln: Professor of English Language and Literature
 J.C. Gittins, MA, D.Sc., Fellow of Keble: Professor of Statistics
 A.M. Glazer, MA, Fellow of Jesus: Professor of Physics
 M.D. Goodman, MA, D.Phil., Fellow of Wolfson: Professor of Jewish Studies
 M.J. Goringe, MA, D.Phil., Fellow of Pembroke: Professor of Materials Science
 J.N. Gray, MA, D.Phil., Fellow of Jesus: Professor of Politics
 S.A. Greenfield, MA, D.Phil., Fellow of Lincoln: Professor of Pharmacology
 J.D. Gross, MA status: Professor of Biochemistry
 G. Hancock, MA, Fellow of Trinity: Professor of Chemistry
 J.F. Harris, MA, Fellow of St Catherine's: Professor of Modern History
 J.W. Harris, BCL, MA, Fellow of Keble: Professor of Law
 B.H. Harrison, MA, D.Phil., Fellow of Corpus Christi: Professor of Modern History
 K.E. Hawton, DM, Fellow of Green College: Professor of Psychiatry
 R.G. Haydon, MA, Fellow of Brasenose: Professor of Mathematics
 A.F. Heath, MA, Fellow of Nuffield: Professor of Sociology
 R.E.M. Hedges, MA, D.Phil., Fellow of St Cross: Professor of Archaeology
 J.A. Hiddleston, MA, Fellow of Exeter: Professor of French
 D.R. Higgs, MA status: Professor of Haematology
 A.V.S. Hill, MA, D.Phil., DM, Fellow of Exeter: Professor of Human Genetics
 R.G. Hood, MA, D.Phil., Fellow of All Souls: Professor of Criminology
 J.D. Hunt, MA, D.Phil., Fellow of St Edmund Hall: Professor of Materials Science
 J.J.B. Jack, BM, MA, Fellow of University: Professor of Physiology
 W.R. James, B.Litt., MA, D.Phil., Fellow of St Cross: Professor of Social Anthropology
 C. Jordan, MA, Fellow of Somerville: Professor of Physics
 J.S. Kelly, MA, D.Phil., Fellow of St John's: Professor of English Language and Literature
 W.J. Kennedy, MA, Fellow of Wolfson: Professor of Earth Sciences
 D.S. King, MA, Fellow of St John's: Professor of Politics
 A.J. Kingsman, MA, Fellow of St Catherine's: Professor of Biochemistry
 L.J. Kinlen, MA status, D.Phil.: Professor of Epidemiology
 F.C. Kirwan, MA, D.Phil., Fellow of Balliol: Professor of Mathematics
 J.B. Knight, MA, Fellow of St Edmund Hall: Professor of Economics
 P. Langford, MA, D.Phil., Fellow of Lincoln: Professor of Modern History
 G.M. Lathrop: Professor of Human Genetics
 J.E. Lewis, Fellow of All Souls: Professor of the History of Medicine
 D.E. Logan, MA, Fellow of Balliol: Professor of Chemistry
 P.A. Mackridge, MA, D.Phil., Fellow of St Cross: Professor of Modern Greek
 I.W.F. Maclean, MA, D.Phil., Fellow of Queen's: Professor of French
 P.A. Madden, MA, Fellow of Queen's: Professor of Chemistry
 W.F. McColl, MA, Fellow of Wadham: Professor of Computing Science
 K.A. McLauchlan, MA, Fellow of Hertford: Professor of Chemistry
 I.S. McLean, MA, D.Phil., Fellow of Nuffield: Professor of Politics
 D.M. Metcalf, MA, D.Phil., D.Litt., Fellow of Wolfson: Professor of Numismatics
 J.F. Morris, MA, Fellow of St Hugh's: Professor of Human Anatomy
 G.M. Morriss-Kay, MA: Professor of Human Anatomy
 P.C. Newell, MA, D.Phil., D.Sc., Fellow of St Peter's: Professor of Biochemistry
 E.A. Newsholme, MA, D.Sc., Fellow of Merton: Professor of Biochemistry
 R.J. Nicholas, MA, D.Phil., Fellow of University: Professor of Physics
 P.A. Nuttall, MA, Fellow of Wolfson: Professor of Virology
 J.J. O'Connor, MA, Fellow of St Peter's: Professor of Engineering Science
 R.G. Osborne, MA, Fellow of Corpus Christi: Professor of Ancient History
 R. J. Parish, MA, D.Phil., Fellow of St Catherine's: Professor of French
 A.J. Parker, MA, Fellow of St John's: Professor of Physiology
 M.B. Parkes, B.Litt., MA, D.Litt., Fellow of Keble: Professor of Palaeography
 V.H. Perry, MA, D.Phil.: Professor of Pharmacology
 J.B. Pethica, MA, Fellow of St Cross: Professor of Materials Science
 H.J.O. Pogge von Strandmann, MA, D.Phil., Fellow of University: Professor of Modern History
 T. Powell, MA, Fellow of New College: Professor of Physiology
 N.J. Proudfoot, MA, Fellow of Brasenose: Professor of Experimental Pathology
 C.K. Prout, MA, D.Phil., Fellow of Oriel: Professor of Chemistry
 P.J. Ratcliffe, MA status, Fellow of Jesus: Professor of Medicine
 L.D. Reynolds, MA, Fellow of Brasenose: Professor of Classical Languages and Literature
 V. Reynolds, MA, Fellow of Magdalen: Professor of Biological Anthropology
 P.G. Rivière, B.Litt., MA, D.Phil., Fellow of Linacre: Professor of Social Anthropology
 W.G. Richards, MA, D.Phil., D.Sc., Fellow of Brasenose: Professor of Chemistry
 C.F. Robinson, MA, Student of Christ Church: Professor of European Literature
 B.J. Rogers, MA, Fellow of Lady Margaret Hall: Professor of Experimental Psychology
 E.T. Rolls, MA, D.Phil., Fellow of Corpus Christi: Professor of Experimental Psychology Studies
 C. Ruiz, MA, Fellow of Exeter: Professor of Engineering Science
 J.F. Ryan, MA, Student of Christ Church: Professor of Physics
 R. W. Sheppard, MA, D.Phil., Fellow of Magdalen: Professor of German
 A. Shlaim, MA, Fellow of St Antony's: Professor of International Relations
 E. Sim, MA status, D.Phil., Fellow of St Peter's: Professor of Pharmacology
 G.D.W. Smith, MA, D.Phil., Fellow of Trinity: Professor of Materials Science
 G.L. Smith, MA, Fellow of Wadham: Professor of Pathology
 J.A.C. Smith, MA, Fellow of Magdalen: Professor of Plant Sciences
 P.P. Somogyi, MA status: Professor of Pharmacology 
 D.N. Stacey, MA, D.Phil., Student of Christ Church: Professor of Physics
 J.F. Stein, B.Sc., BM, MA, Fellow of Magdalen: Professor of Physiology
 F.J. Stewart, MA, D.Phil., Fellow of Somerville: Professor of Development Economics
 N.J. Stone, MA, D.Phil., Fellow of St Edmund Hall: Professor of Physics
 O.P. Taplin, MA, D.Phil., Fellow of Magdalen: Professor of Classical Languages and Literature
 J.A. Todd, MA status: Professor of Human Genetics
 R.C. Turner, MA, Fellow of Green College: Professor of Medicine
 M.A. Vaughan, MA, Fellow of Nuffield: Professor of Commonwealth
 M.R. Vaughan-Lee, MA, D.Phil., Student of Christ Church: Professor of Mathematics
 A.J. Ware, MA, D.Phil., Fellow of Worcester: Professor of Politics
 A. Watts, MA, Fellow of St Hugh's: Professor of Biochemistry
 R.P. Wayne, MA, Student of Christ Church: Professor of Chemistry
 A.J. Wilkie, MA, Fellow of Wolfson: Professor of Mathematical Logic
 M. Williams, MA, Fellow of Oriel: Professor of Geography
 T. Wilson, MA, D.Phil., Fellow of Hertford: Professor of Engineering Science
 N.J. White, MA status: Professor of Tropical Medicine
 K.J. Wood, MA status, D.Phil.: Professor of Immunology
 J.F. Wordsworth, MA, Fellow of St Catherine's: Professor of English Language and Literature
 D.A. Wyatt, MA, Fellow of St Edmund Hall: Professor of Law

References 

Lists of people associated with the University of Oxford

Terminology of the University of Oxford
Academic ranks